

402001–402100 

|-bgcolor=#d6d6d6
| 402001 ||  || — || July 25, 2003 || Socorro || LINEAR || — || align=right | 3.7 km || 
|-id=002 bgcolor=#d6d6d6
| 402002 || 2003 QL || — || August 18, 2003 || Campo Imperatore || CINEOS || LIX || align=right | 4.1 km || 
|-id=003 bgcolor=#d6d6d6
| 402003 ||  || — || August 21, 2003 || Campo Imperatore || CINEOS || TIR || align=right | 4.4 km || 
|-id=004 bgcolor=#d6d6d6
| 402004 ||  || — || August 21, 2003 || Campo Imperatore || CINEOS || — || align=right | 3.0 km || 
|-id=005 bgcolor=#d6d6d6
| 402005 ||  || — || August 22, 2003 || Palomar || NEAT || — || align=right | 4.7 km || 
|-id=006 bgcolor=#d6d6d6
| 402006 ||  || — || August 22, 2003 || Socorro || LINEAR || — || align=right | 3.9 km || 
|-id=007 bgcolor=#d6d6d6
| 402007 ||  || — || August 23, 2003 || Palomar || NEAT || — || align=right | 2.4 km || 
|-id=008 bgcolor=#fefefe
| 402008 ||  || — || August 26, 2003 || Piszkéstető || K. Sárneczky, B. Sipőcz || — || align=right data-sort-value="0.76" | 760 m || 
|-id=009 bgcolor=#d6d6d6
| 402009 ||  || — || August 29, 2003 || Haleakala || NEAT || Tj (2.99) || align=right | 3.7 km || 
|-id=010 bgcolor=#FA8072
| 402010 ||  || — || August 30, 2003 || Kitt Peak || Spacewatch || — || align=right | 1.3 km || 
|-id=011 bgcolor=#fefefe
| 402011 ||  || — || September 5, 2003 || Socorro || LINEAR || — || align=right | 1.3 km || 
|-id=012 bgcolor=#d6d6d6
| 402012 ||  || — || September 15, 2003 || Haleakala || NEAT || — || align=right | 3.6 km || 
|-id=013 bgcolor=#fefefe
| 402013 ||  || — || September 15, 2003 || Palomar || NEAT || NYS || align=right data-sort-value="0.69" | 690 m || 
|-id=014 bgcolor=#d6d6d6
| 402014 ||  || — || September 4, 2003 || Campo Imperatore || CINEOS || VER || align=right | 3.8 km || 
|-id=015 bgcolor=#d6d6d6
| 402015 ||  || — || September 17, 2003 || Kitt Peak || Spacewatch || — || align=right | 3.9 km || 
|-id=016 bgcolor=#fefefe
| 402016 ||  || — || September 18, 2003 || Palomar || NEAT || — || align=right data-sort-value="0.94" | 940 m || 
|-id=017 bgcolor=#fefefe
| 402017 ||  || — || September 16, 2003 || Palomar || NEAT || — || align=right | 1.2 km || 
|-id=018 bgcolor=#d6d6d6
| 402018 ||  || — || September 18, 2003 || Kitt Peak || Spacewatch || — || align=right | 3.6 km || 
|-id=019 bgcolor=#fefefe
| 402019 ||  || — || September 16, 2003 || Palomar || NEAT || — || align=right data-sort-value="0.98" | 980 m || 
|-id=020 bgcolor=#d6d6d6
| 402020 ||  || — || September 16, 2003 || Anderson Mesa || LONEOS || LIX || align=right | 4.1 km || 
|-id=021 bgcolor=#d6d6d6
| 402021 ||  || — || September 17, 2003 || Anderson Mesa || LONEOS || Tj (2.97) || align=right | 3.5 km || 
|-id=022 bgcolor=#fefefe
| 402022 ||  || — || September 18, 2003 || Kitt Peak || Spacewatch || MAS || align=right data-sort-value="0.65" | 650 m || 
|-id=023 bgcolor=#fefefe
| 402023 ||  || — || September 17, 2003 || Socorro || LINEAR || — || align=right | 1.1 km || 
|-id=024 bgcolor=#d6d6d6
| 402024 ||  || — || September 17, 2003 || Črni Vrh || Črni Vrh || — || align=right | 4.4 km || 
|-id=025 bgcolor=#fefefe
| 402025 ||  || — || September 20, 2003 || Socorro || LINEAR || H || align=right data-sort-value="0.94" | 940 m || 
|-id=026 bgcolor=#d6d6d6
| 402026 ||  || — || September 16, 2003 || Kitt Peak || Spacewatch || — || align=right | 4.2 km || 
|-id=027 bgcolor=#fefefe
| 402027 ||  || — || September 19, 2003 || Anderson Mesa || LONEOS || NYS || align=right data-sort-value="0.77" | 770 m || 
|-id=028 bgcolor=#d6d6d6
| 402028 ||  || — || September 20, 2003 || Socorro || LINEAR || — || align=right | 3.6 km || 
|-id=029 bgcolor=#fefefe
| 402029 ||  || — || September 20, 2003 || Anderson Mesa || LONEOS || — || align=right data-sort-value="0.92" | 920 m || 
|-id=030 bgcolor=#fefefe
| 402030 ||  || — || September 18, 2003 || Socorro || LINEAR || NYS || align=right data-sort-value="0.84" | 840 m || 
|-id=031 bgcolor=#d6d6d6
| 402031 ||  || — || September 18, 2003 || Kitt Peak || Spacewatch || THM || align=right | 3.0 km || 
|-id=032 bgcolor=#d6d6d6
| 402032 ||  || — || September 21, 2003 || Palomar || NEAT || — || align=right | 3.2 km || 
|-id=033 bgcolor=#fefefe
| 402033 ||  || — || September 22, 2003 || Anderson Mesa || LONEOS || — || align=right data-sort-value="0.76" | 760 m || 
|-id=034 bgcolor=#fefefe
| 402034 ||  || — || September 25, 2003 || Haleakala || NEAT || — || align=right data-sort-value="0.93" | 930 m || 
|-id=035 bgcolor=#d6d6d6
| 402035 ||  || — || September 24, 2003 || Kvistaberg || UDAS || — || align=right | 4.1 km || 
|-id=036 bgcolor=#d6d6d6
| 402036 ||  || — || September 27, 2003 || Socorro || LINEAR || THB || align=right | 3.3 km || 
|-id=037 bgcolor=#d6d6d6
| 402037 ||  || — || September 25, 2003 || Bergisch Gladbach || W. Bickel || — || align=right | 4.0 km || 
|-id=038 bgcolor=#d6d6d6
| 402038 ||  || — || September 27, 2003 || Kitt Peak || Spacewatch || — || align=right | 3.4 km || 
|-id=039 bgcolor=#fefefe
| 402039 ||  || — || September 27, 2003 || Kitt Peak || Spacewatch || — || align=right data-sort-value="0.88" | 880 m || 
|-id=040 bgcolor=#fefefe
| 402040 ||  || — || September 26, 2003 || Socorro || LINEAR || NYS || align=right data-sort-value="0.69" | 690 m || 
|-id=041 bgcolor=#fefefe
| 402041 ||  || — || September 25, 2003 || Palomar || NEAT || NYS || align=right data-sort-value="0.66" | 660 m || 
|-id=042 bgcolor=#fefefe
| 402042 ||  || — || September 27, 2003 || Socorro || LINEAR || — || align=right data-sort-value="0.88" | 880 m || 
|-id=043 bgcolor=#fefefe
| 402043 ||  || — || September 28, 2003 || Kitt Peak || Spacewatch || MAS || align=right data-sort-value="0.66" | 660 m || 
|-id=044 bgcolor=#d6d6d6
| 402044 ||  || — || September 30, 2003 || Socorro || LINEAR || — || align=right | 3.6 km || 
|-id=045 bgcolor=#fefefe
| 402045 ||  || — || September 17, 2003 || Kitt Peak || Spacewatch || — || align=right data-sort-value="0.77" | 770 m || 
|-id=046 bgcolor=#fefefe
| 402046 ||  || — || September 18, 2003 || Kitt Peak || Spacewatch || NYS || align=right data-sort-value="0.68" | 680 m || 
|-id=047 bgcolor=#d6d6d6
| 402047 ||  || — || September 28, 2003 || Socorro || LINEAR || — || align=right | 2.3 km || 
|-id=048 bgcolor=#d6d6d6
| 402048 ||  || — || September 27, 2003 || Socorro || LINEAR || — || align=right | 3.2 km || 
|-id=049 bgcolor=#fefefe
| 402049 ||  || — || September 17, 2003 || Palomar || NEAT || — || align=right | 1.0 km || 
|-id=050 bgcolor=#d6d6d6
| 402050 ||  || — || September 2, 2003 || Socorro || LINEAR || — || align=right | 2.9 km || 
|-id=051 bgcolor=#d6d6d6
| 402051 ||  || — || September 20, 2003 || Kitt Peak || Spacewatch || — || align=right | 2.4 km || 
|-id=052 bgcolor=#d6d6d6
| 402052 ||  || — || September 16, 2003 || Kitt Peak || Spacewatch || — || align=right | 2.3 km || 
|-id=053 bgcolor=#fefefe
| 402053 ||  || — || September 21, 2003 || Kitt Peak || Spacewatch || — || align=right data-sort-value="0.65" | 650 m || 
|-id=054 bgcolor=#d6d6d6
| 402054 ||  || — || September 26, 2003 || Apache Point || SDSS || THM || align=right | 2.2 km || 
|-id=055 bgcolor=#d6d6d6
| 402055 ||  || — || September 26, 2003 || Apache Point || SDSS || — || align=right | 3.6 km || 
|-id=056 bgcolor=#fefefe
| 402056 ||  || — || September 26, 2003 || Apache Point || SDSS || — || align=right data-sort-value="0.78" | 780 m || 
|-id=057 bgcolor=#fefefe
| 402057 ||  || — || September 18, 2003 || Kitt Peak || Spacewatch || MAS || align=right data-sort-value="0.75" | 750 m || 
|-id=058 bgcolor=#fefefe
| 402058 ||  || — || September 26, 2003 || Apache Point || SDSS || — || align=right data-sort-value="0.73" | 730 m || 
|-id=059 bgcolor=#fefefe
| 402059 ||  || — || September 26, 2003 || Apache Point || SDSS || — || align=right data-sort-value="0.85" | 850 m || 
|-id=060 bgcolor=#E9E9E9
| 402060 ||  || — || September 16, 2003 || Kitt Peak || Spacewatch || — || align=right data-sort-value="0.79" | 790 m || 
|-id=061 bgcolor=#d6d6d6
| 402061 ||  || — || September 16, 2003 || Kitt Peak || Spacewatch || — || align=right | 3.0 km || 
|-id=062 bgcolor=#d6d6d6
| 402062 ||  || — || September 16, 2003 || Kitt Peak || Spacewatch || — || align=right | 3.3 km || 
|-id=063 bgcolor=#fefefe
| 402063 ||  || — || September 30, 2003 || Kitt Peak || Spacewatch || — || align=right data-sort-value="0.90" | 900 m || 
|-id=064 bgcolor=#FA8072
| 402064 ||  || — || September 17, 2003 || Socorro || LINEAR || — || align=right data-sort-value="0.89" | 890 m || 
|-id=065 bgcolor=#d6d6d6
| 402065 ||  || — || October 15, 2003 || Socorro || LINEAR || Tj (2.99) || align=right | 4.6 km || 
|-id=066 bgcolor=#d6d6d6
| 402066 ||  || — || October 1, 2003 || Kitt Peak || Spacewatch || — || align=right | 4.6 km || 
|-id=067 bgcolor=#fefefe
| 402067 ||  || — || October 1, 2003 || Kitt Peak || Spacewatch || — || align=right data-sort-value="0.82" | 820 m || 
|-id=068 bgcolor=#fefefe
| 402068 ||  || — || October 2, 2003 || Kitt Peak || Spacewatch || — || align=right | 1.00 km || 
|-id=069 bgcolor=#d6d6d6
| 402069 ||  || — || October 3, 2003 || Kitt Peak || Spacewatch || — || align=right | 2.6 km || 
|-id=070 bgcolor=#fefefe
| 402070 ||  || — || October 20, 2003 || Kingsnake || J. V. McClusky || — || align=right data-sort-value="0.83" | 830 m || 
|-id=071 bgcolor=#fefefe
| 402071 ||  || — || October 19, 2003 || Kitt Peak || Spacewatch || MAS || align=right data-sort-value="0.80" | 800 m || 
|-id=072 bgcolor=#fefefe
| 402072 ||  || — || October 16, 2003 || Kitt Peak || Spacewatch || NYS || align=right data-sort-value="0.69" | 690 m || 
|-id=073 bgcolor=#d6d6d6
| 402073 ||  || — || October 19, 2003 || Anderson Mesa || LONEOS || EUP || align=right | 5.2 km || 
|-id=074 bgcolor=#fefefe
| 402074 ||  || — || October 20, 2003 || Socorro || LINEAR || — || align=right | 1.4 km || 
|-id=075 bgcolor=#d6d6d6
| 402075 ||  || — || October 21, 2003 || Kitt Peak || Spacewatch || — || align=right | 2.9 km || 
|-id=076 bgcolor=#fefefe
| 402076 ||  || — || October 20, 2003 || Kitt Peak || Spacewatch || NYS || align=right data-sort-value="0.55" | 550 m || 
|-id=077 bgcolor=#fefefe
| 402077 ||  || — || October 21, 2003 || Socorro || LINEAR || MAS || align=right data-sort-value="0.88" | 880 m || 
|-id=078 bgcolor=#fefefe
| 402078 ||  || — || October 21, 2003 || Socorro || LINEAR || — || align=right data-sort-value="0.87" | 870 m || 
|-id=079 bgcolor=#fefefe
| 402079 ||  || — || September 22, 2003 || Kitt Peak || Spacewatch || NYS || align=right data-sort-value="0.53" | 530 m || 
|-id=080 bgcolor=#fefefe
| 402080 ||  || — || October 23, 2003 || Kitt Peak || Spacewatch || MAS || align=right data-sort-value="0.84" | 840 m || 
|-id=081 bgcolor=#d6d6d6
| 402081 ||  || — || October 24, 2003 || Socorro || LINEAR || — || align=right | 2.8 km || 
|-id=082 bgcolor=#fefefe
| 402082 ||  || — || October 24, 2003 || Socorro || LINEAR || — || align=right data-sort-value="0.71" | 710 m || 
|-id=083 bgcolor=#fefefe
| 402083 ||  || — || October 21, 2003 || Kitt Peak || Spacewatch || NYS || align=right data-sort-value="0.69" | 690 m || 
|-id=084 bgcolor=#fefefe
| 402084 ||  || — || October 22, 2003 || Kitt Peak || Spacewatch || — || align=right data-sort-value="0.70" | 700 m || 
|-id=085 bgcolor=#fefefe
| 402085 ||  || — || October 22, 2003 || Kitt Peak || Spacewatch || — || align=right data-sort-value="0.95" | 950 m || 
|-id=086 bgcolor=#fefefe
| 402086 ||  || — || October 24, 2003 || Kitt Peak || Spacewatch || — || align=right data-sort-value="0.92" | 920 m || 
|-id=087 bgcolor=#fefefe
| 402087 ||  || — || October 24, 2003 || Socorro || LINEAR || — || align=right data-sort-value="0.84" | 840 m || 
|-id=088 bgcolor=#fefefe
| 402088 ||  || — || October 25, 2003 || Socorro || LINEAR || — || align=right data-sort-value="0.91" | 910 m || 
|-id=089 bgcolor=#fefefe
| 402089 ||  || — || October 25, 2003 || Socorro || LINEAR || — || align=right data-sort-value="0.96" | 960 m || 
|-id=090 bgcolor=#fefefe
| 402090 ||  || — || October 21, 2003 || Socorro || LINEAR || NYS || align=right data-sort-value="0.73" | 730 m || 
|-id=091 bgcolor=#d6d6d6
| 402091 ||  || — || October 28, 2003 || Socorro || LINEAR || — || align=right | 3.5 km || 
|-id=092 bgcolor=#fefefe
| 402092 ||  || — || October 28, 2003 || Socorro || LINEAR || NYS || align=right data-sort-value="0.79" | 790 m || 
|-id=093 bgcolor=#fefefe
| 402093 ||  || — || October 27, 2003 || Socorro || LINEAR || — || align=right data-sort-value="0.99" | 990 m || 
|-id=094 bgcolor=#fefefe
| 402094 ||  || — || October 16, 2003 || Kitt Peak || Spacewatch || — || align=right data-sort-value="0.59" | 590 m || 
|-id=095 bgcolor=#fefefe
| 402095 ||  || — || October 18, 2003 || Kitt Peak || Spacewatch || — || align=right data-sort-value="0.88" | 880 m || 
|-id=096 bgcolor=#fefefe
| 402096 ||  || — || October 20, 2003 || Kitt Peak || Spacewatch || — || align=right data-sort-value="0.82" | 820 m || 
|-id=097 bgcolor=#d6d6d6
| 402097 ||  || — || October 22, 2003 || Apache Point || SDSS || — || align=right | 1.9 km || 
|-id=098 bgcolor=#fefefe
| 402098 ||  || — || October 24, 2003 || Socorro || LINEAR || NYS || align=right data-sort-value="0.86" | 860 m || 
|-id=099 bgcolor=#fefefe
| 402099 ||  || — || November 16, 2003 || Kitt Peak || Spacewatch || — || align=right data-sort-value="0.78" | 780 m || 
|-id=100 bgcolor=#E9E9E9
| 402100 ||  || — || November 19, 2003 || Socorro || LINEAR || — || align=right | 1.7 km || 
|}

402101–402200 

|-bgcolor=#fefefe
| 402101 ||  || — || November 19, 2003 || Kitt Peak || Spacewatch || — || align=right data-sort-value="0.83" | 830 m || 
|-id=102 bgcolor=#fefefe
| 402102 ||  || — || November 22, 2003 || Kitt Peak || Spacewatch || — || align=right data-sort-value="0.97" | 970 m || 
|-id=103 bgcolor=#FA8072
| 402103 ||  || — || November 20, 2003 || Socorro || LINEAR || — || align=right data-sort-value="0.71" | 710 m || 
|-id=104 bgcolor=#fefefe
| 402104 ||  || — || November 28, 2003 || Kitt Peak || Spacewatch || NYS || align=right data-sort-value="0.75" | 750 m || 
|-id=105 bgcolor=#fefefe
| 402105 ||  || — || December 14, 2003 || Palomar || NEAT || — || align=right | 1.2 km || 
|-id=106 bgcolor=#fefefe
| 402106 ||  || — || November 20, 2003 || Kitt Peak || Spacewatch || — || align=right data-sort-value="0.96" | 960 m || 
|-id=107 bgcolor=#fefefe
| 402107 ||  || — || December 17, 2003 || Kitt Peak || Spacewatch || NYS || align=right data-sort-value="0.67" | 670 m || 
|-id=108 bgcolor=#E9E9E9
| 402108 ||  || — || December 19, 2003 || Kitt Peak || Spacewatch || EUN || align=right | 1.4 km || 
|-id=109 bgcolor=#E9E9E9
| 402109 ||  || — || January 15, 2004 || Kitt Peak || Spacewatch || — || align=right data-sort-value="0.94" | 940 m || 
|-id=110 bgcolor=#E9E9E9
| 402110 ||  || — || January 18, 2004 || Palomar || NEAT || — || align=right | 1.4 km || 
|-id=111 bgcolor=#E9E9E9
| 402111 ||  || — || January 22, 2004 || Socorro || LINEAR || — || align=right | 1.1 km || 
|-id=112 bgcolor=#E9E9E9
| 402112 ||  || — || January 31, 2004 || Campo Imperatore || CINEOS || HNS || align=right | 1.2 km || 
|-id=113 bgcolor=#E9E9E9
| 402113 ||  || — || January 26, 2004 || Anderson Mesa || LONEOS || — || align=right | 1.1 km || 
|-id=114 bgcolor=#E9E9E9
| 402114 ||  || — || January 24, 2004 || Socorro || LINEAR || — || align=right | 1.2 km || 
|-id=115 bgcolor=#E9E9E9
| 402115 ||  || — || January 30, 2004 || Socorro || LINEAR || HNS || align=right | 1.4 km || 
|-id=116 bgcolor=#E9E9E9
| 402116 ||  || — || February 12, 2004 || Goodricke-Pigott || R. A. Tucker || EUN || align=right | 1.5 km || 
|-id=117 bgcolor=#E9E9E9
| 402117 ||  || — || February 11, 2004 || Kitt Peak || Spacewatch || — || align=right | 1.1 km || 
|-id=118 bgcolor=#E9E9E9
| 402118 ||  || — || February 10, 2004 || Palomar || NEAT || — || align=right | 1.1 km || 
|-id=119 bgcolor=#E9E9E9
| 402119 ||  || — || February 13, 2004 || Jonathan B. Postel || Jonathan B. Postel Obs. || — || align=right | 1.9 km || 
|-id=120 bgcolor=#E9E9E9
| 402120 ||  || — || February 12, 2004 || Kitt Peak || Spacewatch || — || align=right | 1.1 km || 
|-id=121 bgcolor=#E9E9E9
| 402121 ||  || — || February 11, 2004 || Kitt Peak || Spacewatch || — || align=right | 1.2 km || 
|-id=122 bgcolor=#E9E9E9
| 402122 ||  || — || February 17, 2004 || Kitt Peak || Spacewatch || — || align=right | 1.5 km || 
|-id=123 bgcolor=#E9E9E9
| 402123 ||  || — || March 10, 2004 || Palomar || NEAT || — || align=right | 1.4 km || 
|-id=124 bgcolor=#E9E9E9
| 402124 ||  || — || February 26, 2004 || Socorro || LINEAR || — || align=right | 2.6 km || 
|-id=125 bgcolor=#E9E9E9
| 402125 ||  || — || March 15, 2004 || Catalina || CSS || — || align=right | 2.1 km || 
|-id=126 bgcolor=#E9E9E9
| 402126 ||  || — || March 15, 2004 || Socorro || LINEAR || — || align=right | 2.7 km || 
|-id=127 bgcolor=#E9E9E9
| 402127 ||  || — || March 23, 2004 || Kitt Peak || Spacewatch || — || align=right | 1.2 km || 
|-id=128 bgcolor=#E9E9E9
| 402128 ||  || — || April 12, 2004 || Kitt Peak || Spacewatch || DOR || align=right | 2.3 km || 
|-id=129 bgcolor=#E9E9E9
| 402129 ||  || — || April 15, 2004 || Socorro || LINEAR ||  || align=right | 2.6 km || 
|-id=130 bgcolor=#E9E9E9
| 402130 ||  || — || April 20, 2004 || Socorro || LINEAR || — || align=right | 3.1 km || 
|-id=131 bgcolor=#fefefe
| 402131 ||  || — || June 14, 2004 || Kitt Peak || Spacewatch || — || align=right data-sort-value="0.62" | 620 m || 
|-id=132 bgcolor=#d6d6d6
| 402132 ||  || — || July 16, 2004 || Socorro || LINEAR || — || align=right | 2.9 km || 
|-id=133 bgcolor=#d6d6d6
| 402133 ||  || — || August 8, 2004 || Socorro || LINEAR || — || align=right | 2.1 km || 
|-id=134 bgcolor=#d6d6d6
| 402134 ||  || — || August 6, 2004 || Campo Imperatore || CINEOS || — || align=right | 3.0 km || 
|-id=135 bgcolor=#d6d6d6
| 402135 ||  || — || August 7, 2004 || Palomar || NEAT || — || align=right | 2.7 km || 
|-id=136 bgcolor=#FA8072
| 402136 ||  || — || August 9, 2004 || Socorro || LINEAR || H || align=right data-sort-value="0.75" | 750 m || 
|-id=137 bgcolor=#fefefe
| 402137 ||  || — || August 12, 2004 || Socorro || LINEAR || — || align=right data-sort-value="0.83" | 830 m || 
|-id=138 bgcolor=#FA8072
| 402138 ||  || — || August 11, 2004 || Socorro || LINEAR || unusual || align=right | 1.6 km || 
|-id=139 bgcolor=#FA8072
| 402139 ||  || — || August 17, 2004 || Socorro || LINEAR || — || align=right data-sort-value="0.87" | 870 m || 
|-id=140 bgcolor=#d6d6d6
| 402140 ||  || — || August 16, 2004 || Palomar || NEAT || — || align=right | 3.2 km || 
|-id=141 bgcolor=#fefefe
| 402141 ||  || — || September 5, 2004 || Bergisch Gladbac || W. Bickel || — || align=right data-sort-value="0.85" | 850 m || 
|-id=142 bgcolor=#fefefe
| 402142 ||  || — || September 6, 2004 || Siding Spring || SSS || — || align=right data-sort-value="0.63" | 630 m || 
|-id=143 bgcolor=#fefefe
| 402143 ||  || — || September 6, 2004 || Palomar || NEAT || — || align=right data-sort-value="0.62" | 620 m || 
|-id=144 bgcolor=#fefefe
| 402144 ||  || — || August 12, 2004 || Campo Imperatore || CINEOS || — || align=right data-sort-value="0.70" | 700 m || 
|-id=145 bgcolor=#d6d6d6
| 402145 ||  || — || September 7, 2004 || Socorro || LINEAR || — || align=right | 2.6 km || 
|-id=146 bgcolor=#fefefe
| 402146 ||  || — || September 8, 2004 || Socorro || LINEAR || — || align=right data-sort-value="0.87" | 870 m || 
|-id=147 bgcolor=#d6d6d6
| 402147 ||  || — || January 15, 1996 || Kitt Peak || Spacewatch || — || align=right | 3.1 km || 
|-id=148 bgcolor=#d6d6d6
| 402148 ||  || — || September 8, 2004 || Socorro || LINEAR || — || align=right | 4.2 km || 
|-id=149 bgcolor=#fefefe
| 402149 ||  || — || September 7, 2004 || Socorro || LINEAR || — || align=right data-sort-value="0.67" | 670 m || 
|-id=150 bgcolor=#fefefe
| 402150 ||  || — || September 8, 2004 || Socorro || LINEAR || — || align=right data-sort-value="0.64" | 640 m || 
|-id=151 bgcolor=#fefefe
| 402151 ||  || — || September 9, 2004 || Socorro || LINEAR || — || align=right data-sort-value="0.76" | 760 m || 
|-id=152 bgcolor=#fefefe
| 402152 ||  || — || September 10, 2004 || Socorro || LINEAR || — || align=right data-sort-value="0.80" | 800 m || 
|-id=153 bgcolor=#d6d6d6
| 402153 ||  || — || September 11, 2004 || Socorro || LINEAR || BRA || align=right | 1.7 km || 
|-id=154 bgcolor=#d6d6d6
| 402154 ||  || — || September 10, 2004 || Socorro || LINEAR || NAE || align=right | 3.2 km || 
|-id=155 bgcolor=#d6d6d6
| 402155 ||  || — || September 10, 2004 || Socorro || LINEAR || — || align=right | 3.9 km || 
|-id=156 bgcolor=#d6d6d6
| 402156 ||  || — || September 10, 2004 || Socorro || LINEAR || — || align=right | 2.8 km || 
|-id=157 bgcolor=#d6d6d6
| 402157 ||  || — || September 10, 2004 || Socorro || LINEAR || BRA || align=right | 1.7 km || 
|-id=158 bgcolor=#fefefe
| 402158 ||  || — || September 10, 2004 || Socorro || LINEAR || — || align=right data-sort-value="0.83" | 830 m || 
|-id=159 bgcolor=#FA8072
| 402159 ||  || — || September 11, 2004 || Socorro || LINEAR || — || align=right | 1.1 km || 
|-id=160 bgcolor=#d6d6d6
| 402160 ||  || — || September 9, 2004 || Kitt Peak || Spacewatch || EOS || align=right | 2.0 km || 
|-id=161 bgcolor=#d6d6d6
| 402161 ||  || — || September 9, 2004 || Kitt Peak || Spacewatch || — || align=right | 2.5 km || 
|-id=162 bgcolor=#fefefe
| 402162 ||  || — || September 9, 2004 || Kitt Peak || Spacewatch || — || align=right data-sort-value="0.75" | 750 m || 
|-id=163 bgcolor=#d6d6d6
| 402163 ||  || — || September 10, 2004 || Kitt Peak || Spacewatch || — || align=right | 2.0 km || 
|-id=164 bgcolor=#d6d6d6
| 402164 ||  || — || September 9, 2004 || Anderson Mesa || LONEOS || — || align=right | 2.8 km || 
|-id=165 bgcolor=#d6d6d6
| 402165 ||  || — || September 10, 2004 || Kitt Peak || Spacewatch || — || align=right | 2.3 km || 
|-id=166 bgcolor=#fefefe
| 402166 ||  || — || September 11, 2004 || Kitt Peak || Spacewatch || — || align=right data-sort-value="0.64" | 640 m || 
|-id=167 bgcolor=#fefefe
| 402167 ||  || — || September 8, 2004 || Socorro || LINEAR || — || align=right data-sort-value="0.77" | 770 m || 
|-id=168 bgcolor=#d6d6d6
| 402168 ||  || — || September 13, 2004 || Socorro || LINEAR || — || align=right | 3.3 km || 
|-id=169 bgcolor=#d6d6d6
| 402169 ||  || — || September 12, 2004 || Kitt Peak || Spacewatch || — || align=right | 2.3 km || 
|-id=170 bgcolor=#fefefe
| 402170 ||  || — || September 15, 2004 || Kitt Peak || Spacewatch || — || align=right data-sort-value="0.63" | 630 m || 
|-id=171 bgcolor=#d6d6d6
| 402171 ||  || — || September 12, 2004 || Kitt Peak || Spacewatch || — || align=right | 3.2 km || 
|-id=172 bgcolor=#fefefe
| 402172 ||  || — || September 8, 2004 || Socorro || LINEAR || — || align=right data-sort-value="0.62" | 620 m || 
|-id=173 bgcolor=#fefefe
| 402173 ||  || — || September 18, 2004 || Socorro || LINEAR || — || align=right data-sort-value="0.90" | 900 m || 
|-id=174 bgcolor=#d6d6d6
| 402174 ||  || — || September 22, 2004 || Kitt Peak || Spacewatch || — || align=right | 2.2 km || 
|-id=175 bgcolor=#d6d6d6
| 402175 ||  || — || October 4, 2004 || Kitt Peak || Spacewatch || — || align=right | 1.7 km || 
|-id=176 bgcolor=#d6d6d6
| 402176 ||  || — || October 4, 2004 || Kitt Peak || Spacewatch || — || align=right | 2.8 km || 
|-id=177 bgcolor=#d6d6d6
| 402177 ||  || — || October 4, 2004 || Kitt Peak || Spacewatch || — || align=right | 3.9 km || 
|-id=178 bgcolor=#fefefe
| 402178 ||  || — || October 4, 2004 || Kitt Peak || Spacewatch || — || align=right data-sort-value="0.81" | 810 m || 
|-id=179 bgcolor=#fefefe
| 402179 ||  || — || October 4, 2004 || Kitt Peak || Spacewatch || — || align=right data-sort-value="0.83" | 830 m || 
|-id=180 bgcolor=#d6d6d6
| 402180 ||  || — || October 5, 2004 || Anderson Mesa || LONEOS || — || align=right | 2.5 km || 
|-id=181 bgcolor=#d6d6d6
| 402181 ||  || — || October 6, 2004 || Kitt Peak || Spacewatch || — || align=right | 3.5 km || 
|-id=182 bgcolor=#fefefe
| 402182 ||  || — || October 6, 2004 || Kitt Peak || Spacewatch || — || align=right data-sort-value="0.60" | 600 m || 
|-id=183 bgcolor=#fefefe
| 402183 ||  || — || October 5, 2004 || Kitt Peak || Spacewatch || V || align=right data-sort-value="0.79" | 790 m || 
|-id=184 bgcolor=#d6d6d6
| 402184 ||  || — || October 5, 2004 || Kitt Peak || Spacewatch || — || align=right | 3.2 km || 
|-id=185 bgcolor=#fefefe
| 402185 ||  || — || September 7, 2004 || Kitt Peak || Spacewatch || — || align=right data-sort-value="0.77" | 770 m || 
|-id=186 bgcolor=#d6d6d6
| 402186 ||  || — || October 6, 2004 || Kitt Peak || Spacewatch || EOS || align=right | 2.1 km || 
|-id=187 bgcolor=#d6d6d6
| 402187 ||  || — || October 7, 2004 || Kitt Peak || Spacewatch || — || align=right | 1.8 km || 
|-id=188 bgcolor=#d6d6d6
| 402188 ||  || — || October 7, 2004 || Kitt Peak || Spacewatch || — || align=right | 2.3 km || 
|-id=189 bgcolor=#d6d6d6
| 402189 ||  || — || October 9, 2004 || Anderson Mesa || LONEOS || EOS || align=right | 2.4 km || 
|-id=190 bgcolor=#d6d6d6
| 402190 ||  || — || October 6, 2004 || Kitt Peak || Spacewatch || — || align=right | 2.1 km || 
|-id=191 bgcolor=#fefefe
| 402191 ||  || — || October 6, 2004 || Kitt Peak || Spacewatch || — || align=right data-sort-value="0.81" | 810 m || 
|-id=192 bgcolor=#fefefe
| 402192 ||  || — || October 6, 2004 || Kitt Peak || Spacewatch || — || align=right data-sort-value="0.88" | 880 m || 
|-id=193 bgcolor=#d6d6d6
| 402193 ||  || — || October 7, 2004 || Kitt Peak || Spacewatch || (1298) || align=right | 3.1 km || 
|-id=194 bgcolor=#d6d6d6
| 402194 ||  || — || October 7, 2004 || Kitt Peak || Spacewatch || TIR || align=right | 3.2 km || 
|-id=195 bgcolor=#d6d6d6
| 402195 ||  || — || October 8, 2004 || Kitt Peak || Spacewatch || (1298) || align=right | 3.0 km || 
|-id=196 bgcolor=#d6d6d6
| 402196 ||  || — || October 5, 2004 || Kitt Peak || Spacewatch || — || align=right | 2.8 km || 
|-id=197 bgcolor=#d6d6d6
| 402197 ||  || — || September 7, 2004 || Kitt Peak || Spacewatch || — || align=right | 3.0 km || 
|-id=198 bgcolor=#fefefe
| 402198 ||  || — || October 9, 2004 || Kitt Peak || Spacewatch || V || align=right data-sort-value="0.57" | 570 m || 
|-id=199 bgcolor=#d6d6d6
| 402199 ||  || — || October 8, 2004 || Socorro || LINEAR || EOS || align=right | 2.7 km || 
|-id=200 bgcolor=#d6d6d6
| 402200 ||  || — || October 9, 2004 || Kitt Peak || Spacewatch || — || align=right | 2.2 km || 
|}

402201–402300 

|-bgcolor=#d6d6d6
| 402201 ||  || — || October 6, 2004 || Kitt Peak || Spacewatch || — || align=right | 2.4 km || 
|-id=202 bgcolor=#fefefe
| 402202 ||  || — || November 4, 2004 || Anderson Mesa || LONEOS || — || align=right data-sort-value="0.86" | 860 m || 
|-id=203 bgcolor=#fefefe
| 402203 ||  || — || November 4, 2004 || Catalina || CSS || — || align=right data-sort-value="0.80" | 800 m || 
|-id=204 bgcolor=#d6d6d6
| 402204 ||  || — || November 12, 2004 || Catalina || CSS || — || align=right | 2.3 km || 
|-id=205 bgcolor=#d6d6d6
| 402205 ||  || — || October 10, 2004 || Kitt Peak || Spacewatch || — || align=right | 2.5 km || 
|-id=206 bgcolor=#fefefe
| 402206 ||  || — || November 3, 2004 || Anderson Mesa || LONEOS || — || align=right data-sort-value="0.75" | 750 m || 
|-id=207 bgcolor=#d6d6d6
| 402207 ||  || — || November 17, 2004 || Campo Imperatore || CINEOS || — || align=right | 2.5 km || 
|-id=208 bgcolor=#fefefe
| 402208 ||  || — || October 15, 2004 || Mount Lemmon || Mount Lemmon Survey || (2076) || align=right data-sort-value="0.95" | 950 m || 
|-id=209 bgcolor=#d6d6d6
| 402209 ||  || — || December 2, 2004 || Catalina || CSS || — || align=right | 2.6 km || 
|-id=210 bgcolor=#d6d6d6
| 402210 ||  || — || December 12, 2004 || Kitt Peak || Spacewatch || LIX || align=right | 3.7 km || 
|-id=211 bgcolor=#d6d6d6
| 402211 ||  || — || December 12, 2004 || Kitt Peak || Spacewatch || — || align=right | 4.2 km || 
|-id=212 bgcolor=#d6d6d6
| 402212 ||  || — || December 10, 2004 || Socorro || LINEAR || — || align=right | 4.4 km || 
|-id=213 bgcolor=#fefefe
| 402213 ||  || — || December 14, 2004 || Socorro || LINEAR || — || align=right data-sort-value="0.90" | 900 m || 
|-id=214 bgcolor=#d6d6d6
| 402214 ||  || — || December 2, 2004 || Socorro || LINEAR || LIX || align=right | 3.6 km || 
|-id=215 bgcolor=#fefefe
| 402215 ||  || — || December 18, 2004 || Mount Lemmon || Mount Lemmon Survey || — || align=right data-sort-value="0.91" | 910 m || 
|-id=216 bgcolor=#fefefe
| 402216 ||  || — || January 9, 2005 || Catalina || CSS || H || align=right data-sort-value="0.75" | 750 m || 
|-id=217 bgcolor=#d6d6d6
| 402217 ||  || — || December 16, 2004 || Kitt Peak || Spacewatch || — || align=right | 4.0 km || 
|-id=218 bgcolor=#fefefe
| 402218 ||  || — || January 13, 2005 || Socorro || LINEAR || — || align=right data-sort-value="0.83" | 830 m || 
|-id=219 bgcolor=#fefefe
| 402219 ||  || — || January 11, 2005 || Socorro || LINEAR || — || align=right data-sort-value="0.76" | 760 m || 
|-id=220 bgcolor=#d6d6d6
| 402220 ||  || — || January 15, 2005 || Catalina || CSS || EUP || align=right | 3.9 km || 
|-id=221 bgcolor=#d6d6d6
| 402221 ||  || — || February 9, 2005 || La Silla || A. Boattini, H. Scholl || — || align=right | 2.6 km || 
|-id=222 bgcolor=#fefefe
| 402222 ||  || — || February 9, 2005 || Mount Lemmon || Mount Lemmon Survey || — || align=right data-sort-value="0.75" | 750 m || 
|-id=223 bgcolor=#d6d6d6
| 402223 ||  || — || March 4, 2005 || Catalina || CSS || — || align=right | 4.1 km || 
|-id=224 bgcolor=#E9E9E9
| 402224 ||  || — || March 10, 2005 || Mount Lemmon || Mount Lemmon Survey || — || align=right data-sort-value="0.83" | 830 m || 
|-id=225 bgcolor=#E9E9E9
| 402225 ||  || — || March 10, 2005 || Kitt Peak || Spacewatch || — || align=right data-sort-value="0.86" | 860 m || 
|-id=226 bgcolor=#E9E9E9
| 402226 ||  || — || March 10, 2005 || Kitt Peak || Spacewatch || — || align=right | 2.0 km || 
|-id=227 bgcolor=#fefefe
| 402227 ||  || — || March 13, 2005 || Catalina || CSS || — || align=right | 1.1 km || 
|-id=228 bgcolor=#fefefe
| 402228 ||  || — || March 8, 2005 || Anderson Mesa || LONEOS || — || align=right | 1.1 km || 
|-id=229 bgcolor=#E9E9E9
| 402229 ||  || — || March 2, 2001 || Kitt Peak || Spacewatch || — || align=right data-sort-value="0.96" | 960 m || 
|-id=230 bgcolor=#E9E9E9
| 402230 ||  || — || April 1, 2005 || Kitt Peak || Spacewatch || — || align=right | 1.0 km || 
|-id=231 bgcolor=#E9E9E9
| 402231 ||  || — || April 5, 2005 || Mount Lemmon || Mount Lemmon Survey || EUN || align=right | 1.2 km || 
|-id=232 bgcolor=#E9E9E9
| 402232 ||  || — || April 5, 2005 || Kitt Peak || Spacewatch || — || align=right | 1.2 km || 
|-id=233 bgcolor=#E9E9E9
| 402233 ||  || — || April 2, 2005 || Mount Lemmon || Mount Lemmon Survey || — || align=right | 1.4 km || 
|-id=234 bgcolor=#E9E9E9
| 402234 ||  || — || April 2, 2005 || Mount Lemmon || Mount Lemmon Survey || — || align=right | 1.2 km || 
|-id=235 bgcolor=#E9E9E9
| 402235 ||  || — || April 4, 2005 || Mount Lemmon || Mount Lemmon Survey || ADE || align=right | 1.4 km || 
|-id=236 bgcolor=#E9E9E9
| 402236 ||  || — || April 9, 2005 || Mount Lemmon || Mount Lemmon Survey || — || align=right | 1.5 km || 
|-id=237 bgcolor=#E9E9E9
| 402237 ||  || — || March 11, 2005 || Mount Lemmon || Mount Lemmon Survey || — || align=right | 1.0 km || 
|-id=238 bgcolor=#E9E9E9
| 402238 ||  || — || April 12, 2005 || Anderson Mesa || LONEOS || — || align=right | 1.2 km || 
|-id=239 bgcolor=#E9E9E9
| 402239 ||  || — || April 6, 2005 || Catalina || CSS || — || align=right | 2.9 km || 
|-id=240 bgcolor=#E9E9E9
| 402240 ||  || — || May 10, 2005 || Kitt Peak || Spacewatch || — || align=right | 1.0 km || 
|-id=241 bgcolor=#E9E9E9
| 402241 ||  || — || May 8, 2005 || Anderson Mesa || LONEOS || — || align=right | 1.8 km || 
|-id=242 bgcolor=#E9E9E9
| 402242 ||  || — || May 11, 2005 || Kitt Peak || Spacewatch || JUN || align=right data-sort-value="0.87" | 870 m || 
|-id=243 bgcolor=#E9E9E9
| 402243 ||  || — || May 14, 2005 || Mount Lemmon || Mount Lemmon Survey || — || align=right | 1.3 km || 
|-id=244 bgcolor=#fefefe
| 402244 ||  || — || May 4, 2005 || Kitt Peak || Spacewatch || — || align=right data-sort-value="0.96" | 960 m || 
|-id=245 bgcolor=#E9E9E9
| 402245 ||  || — || May 13, 2005 || Kitt Peak || Spacewatch || JUN || align=right data-sort-value="0.78" | 780 m || 
|-id=246 bgcolor=#E9E9E9
| 402246 ||  || — || May 20, 2005 || Palomar || NEAT || — || align=right | 1.7 km || 
|-id=247 bgcolor=#E9E9E9
| 402247 ||  || — || May 31, 2005 || Catalina || CSS || — || align=right | 4.0 km || 
|-id=248 bgcolor=#E9E9E9
| 402248 ||  || — || June 1, 2005 || Kitt Peak || Spacewatch || — || align=right | 1.5 km || 
|-id=249 bgcolor=#E9E9E9
| 402249 ||  || — || June 3, 2005 || Kitt Peak || Spacewatch || — || align=right | 2.9 km || 
|-id=250 bgcolor=#E9E9E9
| 402250 ||  || — || June 16, 2005 || Mount Lemmon || Mount Lemmon Survey || EUN || align=right | 1.6 km || 
|-id=251 bgcolor=#E9E9E9
| 402251 ||  || — || June 18, 2005 || Mount Lemmon || Mount Lemmon Survey || — || align=right | 1.1 km || 
|-id=252 bgcolor=#E9E9E9
| 402252 ||  || — || June 29, 2005 || Kitt Peak || Spacewatch || — || align=right | 1.9 km || 
|-id=253 bgcolor=#E9E9E9
| 402253 ||  || — || June 29, 2005 || Kitt Peak || Spacewatch || — || align=right | 2.2 km || 
|-id=254 bgcolor=#E9E9E9
| 402254 ||  || — || July 4, 2005 || Mount Lemmon || Mount Lemmon Survey || — || align=right | 1.9 km || 
|-id=255 bgcolor=#E9E9E9
| 402255 ||  || — || July 4, 2005 || Kitt Peak || Spacewatch || — || align=right | 1.8 km || 
|-id=256 bgcolor=#E9E9E9
| 402256 ||  || — || July 4, 2005 || Mount Lemmon || Mount Lemmon Survey || — || align=right | 1.8 km || 
|-id=257 bgcolor=#E9E9E9
| 402257 ||  || — || July 12, 2005 || Kitt Peak || Spacewatch || AGN || align=right | 1.2 km || 
|-id=258 bgcolor=#E9E9E9
| 402258 ||  || — || August 4, 2005 || Palomar || NEAT || — || align=right | 2.3 km || 
|-id=259 bgcolor=#E9E9E9
| 402259 ||  || — || August 26, 2005 || Palomar || NEAT || — || align=right | 1.8 km || 
|-id=260 bgcolor=#E9E9E9
| 402260 ||  || — || August 2, 2005 || Socorro || LINEAR || — || align=right | 3.2 km || 
|-id=261 bgcolor=#E9E9E9
| 402261 ||  || — || August 29, 2005 || Socorro || LINEAR ||  || align=right | 1.6 km || 
|-id=262 bgcolor=#fefefe
| 402262 ||  || — || August 28, 2005 || Kitt Peak || Spacewatch || — || align=right data-sort-value="0.60" | 600 m || 
|-id=263 bgcolor=#E9E9E9
| 402263 ||  || — || August 28, 2005 || Kitt Peak || Spacewatch || — || align=right | 1.9 km || 
|-id=264 bgcolor=#E9E9E9
| 402264 ||  || — || August 28, 2005 || Kitt Peak || Spacewatch || MRX || align=right data-sort-value="0.77" | 770 m || 
|-id=265 bgcolor=#E9E9E9
| 402265 ||  || — || August 30, 2005 || Palomar || NEAT || — || align=right | 2.6 km || 
|-id=266 bgcolor=#E9E9E9
| 402266 ||  || — || August 31, 2005 || Palomar || NEAT || — || align=right | 2.2 km || 
|-id=267 bgcolor=#FFC2E0
| 402267 ||  || — || August 30, 2005 || Anderson Mesa || LONEOS || AMO +1km || align=right | 1.4 km || 
|-id=268 bgcolor=#E9E9E9
| 402268 ||  || — || August 29, 2005 || Palomar || NEAT || TIN || align=right | 1.1 km || 
|-id=269 bgcolor=#E9E9E9
| 402269 ||  || — || August 29, 2005 || Palomar || NEAT || — || align=right | 1.7 km || 
|-id=270 bgcolor=#E9E9E9
| 402270 ||  || — || August 29, 2005 || Kitt Peak || Spacewatch || — || align=right | 2.5 km || 
|-id=271 bgcolor=#E9E9E9
| 402271 ||  || — || August 31, 2005 || Kitt Peak || Spacewatch || — || align=right | 1.8 km || 
|-id=272 bgcolor=#E9E9E9
| 402272 ||  || — || September 1, 2005 || Kitt Peak || Spacewatch || AGN || align=right | 1.1 km || 
|-id=273 bgcolor=#E9E9E9
| 402273 ||  || — || September 10, 2005 || Anderson Mesa || LONEOS || — || align=right | 3.0 km || 
|-id=274 bgcolor=#E9E9E9
| 402274 ||  || — || September 24, 2005 || Kitt Peak || Spacewatch || — || align=right | 1.9 km || 
|-id=275 bgcolor=#E9E9E9
| 402275 ||  || — || September 25, 2005 || Catalina || CSS || — || align=right | 3.0 km || 
|-id=276 bgcolor=#E9E9E9
| 402276 ||  || — || September 23, 2005 || Kitt Peak || Spacewatch || MRX || align=right | 1.1 km || 
|-id=277 bgcolor=#E9E9E9
| 402277 ||  || — || September 25, 2005 || Kitt Peak || Spacewatch || — || align=right | 2.1 km || 
|-id=278 bgcolor=#d6d6d6
| 402278 ||  || — || September 24, 2005 || Kitt Peak || Spacewatch || KOR || align=right | 1.2 km || 
|-id=279 bgcolor=#E9E9E9
| 402279 ||  || — || September 25, 2005 || Kitt Peak || Spacewatch || GEF || align=right | 1.4 km || 
|-id=280 bgcolor=#E9E9E9
| 402280 ||  || — || September 25, 2005 || Kitt Peak || Spacewatch || — || align=right | 1.8 km || 
|-id=281 bgcolor=#E9E9E9
| 402281 ||  || — || September 28, 2005 || Palomar || NEAT || GEF || align=right | 1.2 km || 
|-id=282 bgcolor=#E9E9E9
| 402282 ||  || — || September 29, 2005 || Anderson Mesa || LONEOS || — || align=right | 2.2 km || 
|-id=283 bgcolor=#E9E9E9
| 402283 ||  || — || September 25, 2005 || Kitt Peak || Spacewatch || — || align=right | 2.2 km || 
|-id=284 bgcolor=#d6d6d6
| 402284 ||  || — || September 27, 2005 || Kitt Peak || Spacewatch || — || align=right | 3.5 km || 
|-id=285 bgcolor=#E9E9E9
| 402285 ||  || — || September 27, 2005 || Palomar || NEAT || JUN || align=right | 1.4 km || 
|-id=286 bgcolor=#d6d6d6
| 402286 ||  || — || September 29, 2005 || Kitt Peak || Spacewatch || — || align=right | 2.2 km || 
|-id=287 bgcolor=#d6d6d6
| 402287 ||  || — || September 29, 2005 || Kitt Peak || Spacewatch || — || align=right | 2.7 km || 
|-id=288 bgcolor=#E9E9E9
| 402288 ||  || — || September 29, 2005 || Mount Lemmon || Mount Lemmon Survey || — || align=right | 2.4 km || 
|-id=289 bgcolor=#E9E9E9
| 402289 ||  || — || September 29, 2005 || Kitt Peak || Spacewatch || — || align=right | 3.0 km || 
|-id=290 bgcolor=#FA8072
| 402290 ||  || — || September 30, 2005 || Kitt Peak || Spacewatch || — || align=right data-sort-value="0.41" | 410 m || 
|-id=291 bgcolor=#E9E9E9
| 402291 ||  || — || September 30, 2005 || Kitt Peak || Spacewatch || — || align=right | 1.9 km || 
|-id=292 bgcolor=#d6d6d6
| 402292 ||  || — || September 30, 2005 || Kitt Peak || Spacewatch || — || align=right | 2.5 km || 
|-id=293 bgcolor=#d6d6d6
| 402293 ||  || — || September 30, 2005 || Goodricke-Pigott || R. A. Tucker || — || align=right | 2.4 km || 
|-id=294 bgcolor=#E9E9E9
| 402294 ||  || — || September 30, 2005 || Mount Lemmon || Mount Lemmon Survey || AGN || align=right | 1.3 km || 
|-id=295 bgcolor=#E9E9E9
| 402295 ||  || — || September 27, 2005 || Socorro || LINEAR || — || align=right | 2.4 km || 
|-id=296 bgcolor=#E9E9E9
| 402296 ||  || — || September 30, 2005 || Kitt Peak || Spacewatch || — || align=right | 1.9 km || 
|-id=297 bgcolor=#E9E9E9
| 402297 ||  || — || September 12, 2005 || Kitt Peak || Spacewatch || DOR || align=right | 2.5 km || 
|-id=298 bgcolor=#E9E9E9
| 402298 ||  || — || September 30, 2005 || Kitt Peak || Spacewatch || GEF || align=right | 1.2 km || 
|-id=299 bgcolor=#d6d6d6
| 402299 ||  || — || September 30, 2005 || Mount Lemmon || Mount Lemmon Survey || — || align=right | 2.2 km || 
|-id=300 bgcolor=#E9E9E9
| 402300 ||  || — || September 30, 2005 || Kitt Peak || Spacewatch || HOF || align=right | 2.5 km || 
|}

402301–402400 

|-bgcolor=#E9E9E9
| 402301 ||  || — || September 23, 2005 || Catalina || CSS || — || align=right | 2.0 km || 
|-id=302 bgcolor=#E9E9E9
| 402302 ||  || — || September 23, 2005 || Kitt Peak || Spacewatch || — || align=right | 2.0 km || 
|-id=303 bgcolor=#E9E9E9
| 402303 ||  || — || September 25, 2005 || Kitt Peak || Spacewatch || HOF || align=right | 2.7 km || 
|-id=304 bgcolor=#d6d6d6
| 402304 ||  || — || September 29, 2005 || Kitt Peak || Spacewatch || — || align=right | 2.0 km || 
|-id=305 bgcolor=#E9E9E9
| 402305 ||  || — || August 31, 2005 || Anderson Mesa || LONEOS || — || align=right | 2.4 km || 
|-id=306 bgcolor=#d6d6d6
| 402306 ||  || — || October 1, 2005 || Kitt Peak || Spacewatch || KOR || align=right | 1.2 km || 
|-id=307 bgcolor=#E9E9E9
| 402307 ||  || — || September 30, 2005 || Mount Lemmon || Mount Lemmon Survey || AGN || align=right | 1.3 km || 
|-id=308 bgcolor=#FA8072
| 402308 ||  || — || June 17, 2005 || Mount Lemmon || Mount Lemmon Survey || — || align=right | 2.0 km || 
|-id=309 bgcolor=#E9E9E9
| 402309 ||  || — || September 25, 2005 || Kitt Peak || Spacewatch || DOR || align=right | 2.3 km || 
|-id=310 bgcolor=#E9E9E9
| 402310 ||  || — || October 5, 2005 || Kitt Peak || Spacewatch || AGN || align=right | 1.1 km || 
|-id=311 bgcolor=#E9E9E9
| 402311 ||  || — || October 7, 2005 || Kitt Peak || Spacewatch || — || align=right | 2.7 km || 
|-id=312 bgcolor=#E9E9E9
| 402312 ||  || — || October 7, 2005 || Kitt Peak || Spacewatch || MRX || align=right | 1.2 km || 
|-id=313 bgcolor=#d6d6d6
| 402313 ||  || — || September 26, 2005 || Kitt Peak || Spacewatch || KOR || align=right | 1.1 km || 
|-id=314 bgcolor=#d6d6d6
| 402314 ||  || — || September 26, 2005 || Kitt Peak || Spacewatch || KOR || align=right | 1.1 km || 
|-id=315 bgcolor=#d6d6d6
| 402315 ||  || — || October 7, 2005 || Kitt Peak || Spacewatch || — || align=right | 1.9 km || 
|-id=316 bgcolor=#d6d6d6
| 402316 ||  || — || October 7, 2005 || Kitt Peak || Spacewatch || — || align=right | 2.0 km || 
|-id=317 bgcolor=#fefefe
| 402317 ||  || — || October 7, 2005 || Kitt Peak || Spacewatch || — || align=right data-sort-value="0.44" | 440 m || 
|-id=318 bgcolor=#E9E9E9
| 402318 ||  || — || September 30, 2005 || Anderson Mesa || LONEOS || GEF || align=right | 1.1 km || 
|-id=319 bgcolor=#E9E9E9
| 402319 ||  || — || October 6, 2005 || Kitt Peak || Spacewatch || HOF || align=right | 2.3 km || 
|-id=320 bgcolor=#fefefe
| 402320 ||  || — || October 8, 2005 || Kitt Peak || Spacewatch || — || align=right data-sort-value="0.67" | 670 m || 
|-id=321 bgcolor=#E9E9E9
| 402321 ||  || — || September 28, 2005 || Kitt Peak || Spacewatch || — || align=right | 1.9 km || 
|-id=322 bgcolor=#d6d6d6
| 402322 ||  || — || October 1, 2005 || Mount Lemmon || Mount Lemmon Survey || — || align=right | 3.3 km || 
|-id=323 bgcolor=#E9E9E9
| 402323 ||  || — || October 26, 2005 || Mount Graham || W. H. Ryan || — || align=right | 2.0 km || 
|-id=324 bgcolor=#d6d6d6
| 402324 ||  || — || October 1, 2005 || Mount Lemmon || Mount Lemmon Survey || — || align=right | 1.9 km || 
|-id=325 bgcolor=#E9E9E9
| 402325 ||  || — || October 23, 2005 || Catalina || CSS || — || align=right | 3.4 km || 
|-id=326 bgcolor=#E9E9E9
| 402326 ||  || — || October 1, 2005 || Kitt Peak || Spacewatch || DOR || align=right | 3.0 km || 
|-id=327 bgcolor=#d6d6d6
| 402327 ||  || — || October 22, 2005 || Kitt Peak || Spacewatch || — || align=right | 2.0 km || 
|-id=328 bgcolor=#d6d6d6
| 402328 ||  || — || October 22, 2005 || Kitt Peak || Spacewatch || KOR || align=right | 1.4 km || 
|-id=329 bgcolor=#fefefe
| 402329 ||  || — || October 22, 2005 || Kitt Peak || Spacewatch || — || align=right data-sort-value="0.54" | 540 m || 
|-id=330 bgcolor=#d6d6d6
| 402330 ||  || — || October 24, 2005 || Kitt Peak || Spacewatch || KOR || align=right | 1.1 km || 
|-id=331 bgcolor=#d6d6d6
| 402331 ||  || — || October 24, 2005 || Kitt Peak || Spacewatch || — || align=right | 1.7 km || 
|-id=332 bgcolor=#d6d6d6
| 402332 ||  || — || October 1, 2005 || Mount Lemmon || Mount Lemmon Survey || KOR || align=right | 1.2 km || 
|-id=333 bgcolor=#d6d6d6
| 402333 ||  || — || October 1, 2005 || Kitt Peak || Spacewatch || KOR || align=right | 1.1 km || 
|-id=334 bgcolor=#E9E9E9
| 402334 ||  || — || October 28, 2005 || Kitt Peak || Spacewatch || — || align=right | 2.0 km || 
|-id=335 bgcolor=#d6d6d6
| 402335 ||  || — || October 26, 2005 || Kitt Peak || Spacewatch || — || align=right | 2.0 km || 
|-id=336 bgcolor=#fefefe
| 402336 ||  || — || October 26, 2005 || Kitt Peak || Spacewatch || — || align=right data-sort-value="0.60" | 600 m || 
|-id=337 bgcolor=#d6d6d6
| 402337 ||  || — || October 28, 2005 || Kitt Peak || Spacewatch || — || align=right | 2.8 km || 
|-id=338 bgcolor=#d6d6d6
| 402338 ||  || — || October 27, 2005 || Kitt Peak || Spacewatch || — || align=right | 2.3 km || 
|-id=339 bgcolor=#E9E9E9
| 402339 ||  || — || October 31, 2005 || Kitt Peak || Spacewatch || — || align=right | 2.3 km || 
|-id=340 bgcolor=#d6d6d6
| 402340 ||  || — || October 27, 2005 || Mount Lemmon || Mount Lemmon Survey || — || align=right | 1.9 km || 
|-id=341 bgcolor=#E9E9E9
| 402341 ||  || — || October 27, 2005 || Mount Lemmon || Mount Lemmon Survey || — || align=right | 2.0 km || 
|-id=342 bgcolor=#d6d6d6
| 402342 ||  || — || October 28, 2005 || Kitt Peak || Spacewatch || KOR || align=right | 1.2 km || 
|-id=343 bgcolor=#d6d6d6
| 402343 ||  || — || October 28, 2005 || Mount Lemmon || Mount Lemmon Survey || — || align=right | 2.3 km || 
|-id=344 bgcolor=#fefefe
| 402344 ||  || — || October 27, 2005 || Catalina || CSS || — || align=right | 1.0 km || 
|-id=345 bgcolor=#fefefe
| 402345 ||  || — || October 26, 2005 || Kitt Peak || Spacewatch || — || align=right data-sort-value="0.59" | 590 m || 
|-id=346 bgcolor=#E9E9E9
| 402346 ||  || — || October 26, 2005 || Apache Point || A. C. Becker || AGN || align=right | 1.0 km || 
|-id=347 bgcolor=#E9E9E9
| 402347 ||  || — || October 26, 2005 || Apache Point || A. C. Becker || AGN || align=right | 1.0 km || 
|-id=348 bgcolor=#d6d6d6
| 402348 ||  || — || October 27, 2005 || Apache Point || A. C. Becker || — || align=right | 2.6 km || 
|-id=349 bgcolor=#d6d6d6
| 402349 ||  || — || October 27, 2005 || Mount Lemmon || Mount Lemmon Survey || — || align=right | 2.3 km || 
|-id=350 bgcolor=#d6d6d6
| 402350 ||  || — || October 25, 2005 || Kitt Peak || Spacewatch || — || align=right | 2.2 km || 
|-id=351 bgcolor=#d6d6d6
| 402351 ||  || — || October 25, 2005 || Mount Lemmon || Mount Lemmon Survey || — || align=right | 2.4 km || 
|-id=352 bgcolor=#d6d6d6
| 402352 ||  || — || November 4, 2005 || Kitt Peak || Spacewatch || — || align=right | 2.1 km || 
|-id=353 bgcolor=#E9E9E9
| 402353 ||  || — || November 4, 2005 || Catalina || CSS || AGN || align=right | 1.2 km || 
|-id=354 bgcolor=#d6d6d6
| 402354 ||  || — || October 25, 2005 || Kitt Peak || Spacewatch || — || align=right | 2.1 km || 
|-id=355 bgcolor=#E9E9E9
| 402355 ||  || — || November 4, 2005 || Socorro || LINEAR || — || align=right | 2.6 km || 
|-id=356 bgcolor=#d6d6d6
| 402356 ||  || — || October 29, 2005 || Kitt Peak || Spacewatch || — || align=right | 2.6 km || 
|-id=357 bgcolor=#d6d6d6
| 402357 ||  || — || November 10, 2005 || Kitt Peak || Spacewatch || — || align=right | 2.8 km || 
|-id=358 bgcolor=#fefefe
| 402358 ||  || — || November 12, 2005 || Kitt Peak || Spacewatch || — || align=right data-sort-value="0.53" | 530 m || 
|-id=359 bgcolor=#d6d6d6
| 402359 ||  || — || November 5, 2005 || Kitt Peak || Spacewatch || critical || align=right | 1.9 km || 
|-id=360 bgcolor=#E9E9E9
| 402360 ||  || — || November 1, 2005 || Apache Point || A. C. Becker || — || align=right | 2.0 km || 
|-id=361 bgcolor=#d6d6d6
| 402361 ||  || — || November 1, 2005 || Mauna Kea || P. A. Wiegert || — || align=right | 2.2 km || 
|-id=362 bgcolor=#FA8072
| 402362 ||  || — || November 22, 2005 || Kitt Peak || Spacewatch || — || align=right data-sort-value="0.52" | 520 m || 
|-id=363 bgcolor=#E9E9E9
| 402363 ||  || — || November 22, 2005 || Kitt Peak || Spacewatch || — || align=right | 4.0 km || 
|-id=364 bgcolor=#d6d6d6
| 402364 ||  || — || November 21, 2005 || Kitt Peak || Spacewatch || — || align=right | 2.1 km || 
|-id=365 bgcolor=#d6d6d6
| 402365 ||  || — || November 22, 2005 || Kitt Peak || Spacewatch || — || align=right | 2.9 km || 
|-id=366 bgcolor=#fefefe
| 402366 ||  || — || November 21, 2005 || Kitt Peak || Spacewatch || — || align=right data-sort-value="0.50" | 500 m || 
|-id=367 bgcolor=#d6d6d6
| 402367 ||  || — || November 25, 2005 || Kitt Peak || Spacewatch || — || align=right | 2.2 km || 
|-id=368 bgcolor=#d6d6d6
| 402368 ||  || — || November 26, 2005 || Kitt Peak || Spacewatch || — || align=right | 2.4 km || 
|-id=369 bgcolor=#d6d6d6
| 402369 ||  || — || November 29, 2005 || Kitt Peak || Spacewatch || — || align=right | 2.2 km || 
|-id=370 bgcolor=#d6d6d6
| 402370 ||  || — || November 30, 2005 || Kitt Peak || Spacewatch || — || align=right | 2.7 km || 
|-id=371 bgcolor=#d6d6d6
| 402371 ||  || — || November 25, 2005 || Mount Lemmon || Mount Lemmon Survey || — || align=right | 2.5 km || 
|-id=372 bgcolor=#d6d6d6
| 402372 ||  || — || November 25, 2005 || Kitt Peak || Spacewatch || EOS || align=right | 2.2 km || 
|-id=373 bgcolor=#d6d6d6
| 402373 ||  || — || December 3, 2005 || Pla D'Arguines || R. Ferrando || — || align=right | 2.8 km || 
|-id=374 bgcolor=#d6d6d6
| 402374 ||  || — || November 1, 2005 || Kitt Peak || Spacewatch || KOR || align=right | 1.1 km || 
|-id=375 bgcolor=#d6d6d6
| 402375 ||  || — || December 2, 2005 || Mount Lemmon || Mount Lemmon Survey || — || align=right | 2.5 km || 
|-id=376 bgcolor=#d6d6d6
| 402376 ||  || — || December 2, 2005 || Kitt Peak || Spacewatch || KOR || align=right | 1.3 km || 
|-id=377 bgcolor=#fefefe
| 402377 ||  || — || December 6, 2005 || Kitt Peak || Spacewatch || — || align=right data-sort-value="0.67" | 670 m || 
|-id=378 bgcolor=#fefefe
| 402378 ||  || — || December 10, 2005 || Catalina || CSS || H || align=right data-sort-value="0.89" | 890 m || 
|-id=379 bgcolor=#fefefe
| 402379 ||  || — || December 1, 2005 || Kitt Peak || M. W. Buie || NYS || align=right data-sort-value="0.60" | 600 m || 
|-id=380 bgcolor=#d6d6d6
| 402380 ||  || — || December 4, 2005 || Mount Lemmon || Mount Lemmon Survey || — || align=right | 3.0 km || 
|-id=381 bgcolor=#d6d6d6
| 402381 ||  || — || December 22, 2005 || Kitt Peak || Spacewatch || — || align=right | 2.5 km || 
|-id=382 bgcolor=#fefefe
| 402382 ||  || — || December 25, 2005 || Kitt Peak || Spacewatch || — || align=right data-sort-value="0.64" | 640 m || 
|-id=383 bgcolor=#fefefe
| 402383 ||  || — || December 26, 2005 || Kitt Peak || Spacewatch || — || align=right data-sort-value="0.65" | 650 m || 
|-id=384 bgcolor=#d6d6d6
| 402384 ||  || — || December 5, 2005 || Mount Lemmon || Mount Lemmon Survey || — || align=right | 3.3 km || 
|-id=385 bgcolor=#d6d6d6
| 402385 ||  || — || December 26, 2005 || Kitt Peak || Spacewatch || — || align=right | 3.2 km || 
|-id=386 bgcolor=#d6d6d6
| 402386 ||  || — || December 27, 2005 || Catalina || CSS || — || align=right | 4.7 km || 
|-id=387 bgcolor=#d6d6d6
| 402387 ||  || — || December 24, 2005 || Kitt Peak || Spacewatch || — || align=right | 2.3 km || 
|-id=388 bgcolor=#d6d6d6
| 402388 ||  || — || December 24, 2005 || Kitt Peak || Spacewatch || EMA || align=right | 3.3 km || 
|-id=389 bgcolor=#d6d6d6
| 402389 ||  || — || October 27, 2005 || Mount Lemmon || Mount Lemmon Survey || — || align=right | 2.6 km || 
|-id=390 bgcolor=#d6d6d6
| 402390 ||  || — || December 24, 2005 || Kitt Peak || Spacewatch || EOS || align=right | 2.0 km || 
|-id=391 bgcolor=#fefefe
| 402391 ||  || — || December 24, 2005 || Kitt Peak || Spacewatch || — || align=right data-sort-value="0.62" | 620 m || 
|-id=392 bgcolor=#d6d6d6
| 402392 ||  || — || December 24, 2005 || Kitt Peak || Spacewatch || — || align=right | 3.4 km || 
|-id=393 bgcolor=#d6d6d6
| 402393 ||  || — || December 25, 2005 || Mount Lemmon || Mount Lemmon Survey || — || align=right | 2.9 km || 
|-id=394 bgcolor=#d6d6d6
| 402394 ||  || — || November 30, 2005 || Mount Lemmon || Mount Lemmon Survey || EOS || align=right | 2.5 km || 
|-id=395 bgcolor=#fefefe
| 402395 ||  || — || December 24, 2005 || Kitt Peak || Spacewatch || — || align=right data-sort-value="0.81" | 810 m || 
|-id=396 bgcolor=#d6d6d6
| 402396 ||  || — || December 26, 2005 || Kitt Peak || Spacewatch || — || align=right | 3.9 km || 
|-id=397 bgcolor=#d6d6d6
| 402397 ||  || — || December 25, 2005 || Kitt Peak || Spacewatch || KOR || align=right | 1.4 km || 
|-id=398 bgcolor=#d6d6d6
| 402398 ||  || — || December 25, 2005 || Kitt Peak || Spacewatch || — || align=right | 4.0 km || 
|-id=399 bgcolor=#d6d6d6
| 402399 ||  || — || December 25, 2005 || Kitt Peak || Spacewatch || — || align=right | 2.3 km || 
|-id=400 bgcolor=#d6d6d6
| 402400 ||  || — || December 25, 2005 || Kitt Peak || Spacewatch || — || align=right | 2.4 km || 
|}

402401–402500 

|-bgcolor=#fefefe
| 402401 ||  || — || December 27, 2005 || Mount Lemmon || Mount Lemmon Survey || — || align=right data-sort-value="0.50" | 500 m || 
|-id=402 bgcolor=#d6d6d6
| 402402 ||  || — || December 24, 2005 || Socorro || LINEAR || — || align=right | 3.9 km || 
|-id=403 bgcolor=#d6d6d6
| 402403 ||  || — || December 28, 2005 || Mount Lemmon || Mount Lemmon Survey || — || align=right | 3.9 km || 
|-id=404 bgcolor=#d6d6d6
| 402404 ||  || — || December 24, 2005 || Kitt Peak || Spacewatch || — || align=right | 3.0 km || 
|-id=405 bgcolor=#d6d6d6
| 402405 ||  || — || November 10, 2005 || Mount Lemmon || Mount Lemmon Survey || EOS || align=right | 1.9 km || 
|-id=406 bgcolor=#d6d6d6
| 402406 ||  || — || December 26, 2005 || Kitt Peak || Spacewatch || — || align=right | 3.1 km || 
|-id=407 bgcolor=#d6d6d6
| 402407 ||  || — || December 27, 2005 || Mount Lemmon || Mount Lemmon Survey || — || align=right | 2.1 km || 
|-id=408 bgcolor=#fefefe
| 402408 ||  || — || December 28, 2005 || Mount Lemmon || Mount Lemmon Survey || — || align=right data-sort-value="0.55" | 550 m || 
|-id=409 bgcolor=#d6d6d6
| 402409 ||  || — || December 25, 2005 || Kitt Peak || Spacewatch || EOS || align=right | 2.1 km || 
|-id=410 bgcolor=#d6d6d6
| 402410 ||  || — || December 25, 2005 || Kitt Peak || Spacewatch || — || align=right | 3.1 km || 
|-id=411 bgcolor=#fefefe
| 402411 ||  || — || December 29, 2005 || Kitt Peak || Spacewatch || — || align=right data-sort-value="0.69" | 690 m || 
|-id=412 bgcolor=#d6d6d6
| 402412 ||  || — || December 2, 2005 || Mount Lemmon || Mount Lemmon Survey || — || align=right | 2.8 km || 
|-id=413 bgcolor=#d6d6d6
| 402413 ||  || — || December 31, 2005 || Kitt Peak || Spacewatch || EOS || align=right | 2.0 km || 
|-id=414 bgcolor=#d6d6d6
| 402414 ||  || — || December 1, 2005 || Mount Lemmon || Mount Lemmon Survey || — || align=right | 2.7 km || 
|-id=415 bgcolor=#fefefe
| 402415 ||  || — || December 30, 2005 || Kitt Peak || Spacewatch || — || align=right data-sort-value="0.89" | 890 m || 
|-id=416 bgcolor=#d6d6d6
| 402416 ||  || — || December 30, 2005 || Kitt Peak || Spacewatch || — || align=right | 2.7 km || 
|-id=417 bgcolor=#d6d6d6
| 402417 ||  || — || December 2, 2005 || Mount Lemmon || Mount Lemmon Survey || EOS || align=right | 1.6 km || 
|-id=418 bgcolor=#d6d6d6
| 402418 ||  || — || December 22, 2005 || Kitt Peak || Spacewatch || EOS || align=right | 2.0 km || 
|-id=419 bgcolor=#d6d6d6
| 402419 ||  || — || December 29, 2005 || Palomar || NEAT || — || align=right | 3.2 km || 
|-id=420 bgcolor=#d6d6d6
| 402420 ||  || — || December 30, 2005 || Catalina || CSS || EUP || align=right | 3.6 km || 
|-id=421 bgcolor=#d6d6d6
| 402421 ||  || — || December 5, 2005 || Mount Lemmon || Mount Lemmon Survey || — || align=right | 2.8 km || 
|-id=422 bgcolor=#d6d6d6
| 402422 ||  || — || December 27, 2005 || Kitt Peak || Spacewatch || EOS || align=right | 2.0 km || 
|-id=423 bgcolor=#d6d6d6
| 402423 ||  || — || December 30, 2005 || Mount Lemmon || Mount Lemmon Survey || EOS || align=right | 1.7 km || 
|-id=424 bgcolor=#d6d6d6
| 402424 ||  || — || January 2, 2006 || Mount Lemmon || Mount Lemmon Survey || — || align=right | 3.0 km || 
|-id=425 bgcolor=#d6d6d6
| 402425 ||  || — || December 26, 2005 || Kitt Peak || Spacewatch || TIR || align=right | 2.6 km || 
|-id=426 bgcolor=#fefefe
| 402426 ||  || — || January 5, 2006 || Kitt Peak || Spacewatch || — || align=right data-sort-value="0.57" | 570 m || 
|-id=427 bgcolor=#d6d6d6
| 402427 ||  || — || January 2, 2006 || Catalina || CSS || — || align=right | 3.9 km || 
|-id=428 bgcolor=#d6d6d6
| 402428 ||  || — || January 4, 2006 || Kitt Peak || Spacewatch || — || align=right | 2.8 km || 
|-id=429 bgcolor=#fefefe
| 402429 ||  || — || January 4, 2006 || Kitt Peak || Spacewatch || — || align=right data-sort-value="0.60" | 600 m || 
|-id=430 bgcolor=#d6d6d6
| 402430 ||  || — || December 25, 2005 || Mount Lemmon || Mount Lemmon Survey || — || align=right | 3.4 km || 
|-id=431 bgcolor=#d6d6d6
| 402431 ||  || — || January 6, 2006 || Mount Lemmon || Mount Lemmon Survey || — || align=right | 3.3 km || 
|-id=432 bgcolor=#d6d6d6
| 402432 ||  || — || January 5, 2006 || Kitt Peak || Spacewatch || — || align=right | 3.7 km || 
|-id=433 bgcolor=#d6d6d6
| 402433 ||  || — || January 5, 2006 || Kitt Peak || Spacewatch || — || align=right | 2.5 km || 
|-id=434 bgcolor=#d6d6d6
| 402434 ||  || — || December 2, 2005 || Mount Lemmon || Mount Lemmon Survey || EOS || align=right | 2.0 km || 
|-id=435 bgcolor=#d6d6d6
| 402435 ||  || — || January 6, 2006 || Catalina || CSS || — || align=right | 4.3 km || 
|-id=436 bgcolor=#d6d6d6
| 402436 ||  || — || January 7, 2006 || Mount Lemmon || Mount Lemmon Survey || — || align=right | 3.9 km || 
|-id=437 bgcolor=#d6d6d6
| 402437 ||  || — || January 1, 2006 || Catalina || CSS || — || align=right | 4.3 km || 
|-id=438 bgcolor=#fefefe
| 402438 ||  || — || October 22, 1998 || Caussols || ODAS || — || align=right data-sort-value="0.65" | 650 m || 
|-id=439 bgcolor=#fefefe
| 402439 ||  || — || January 8, 2006 || Mount Lemmon || Mount Lemmon Survey || — || align=right data-sort-value="0.75" | 750 m || 
|-id=440 bgcolor=#d6d6d6
| 402440 ||  || — || January 20, 2006 || Kitt Peak || Spacewatch || — || align=right | 3.2 km || 
|-id=441 bgcolor=#d6d6d6
| 402441 ||  || — || January 20, 2006 || Kitt Peak || Spacewatch || LUT || align=right | 4.9 km || 
|-id=442 bgcolor=#d6d6d6
| 402442 ||  || — || January 22, 2006 || Mount Lemmon || Mount Lemmon Survey || — || align=right | 2.2 km || 
|-id=443 bgcolor=#d6d6d6
| 402443 ||  || — || December 28, 2005 || Mount Lemmon || Mount Lemmon Survey || — || align=right | 3.5 km || 
|-id=444 bgcolor=#d6d6d6
| 402444 ||  || — || January 23, 2006 || Mount Lemmon || Mount Lemmon Survey || — || align=right | 3.5 km || 
|-id=445 bgcolor=#fefefe
| 402445 ||  || — || January 7, 2006 || Mount Lemmon || Mount Lemmon Survey || — || align=right | 1.00 km || 
|-id=446 bgcolor=#d6d6d6
| 402446 ||  || — || January 5, 2006 || Mount Lemmon || Mount Lemmon Survey || VER || align=right | 2.8 km || 
|-id=447 bgcolor=#FA8072
| 402447 ||  || — || January 26, 2006 || Mount Lemmon || Mount Lemmon Survey || — || align=right data-sort-value="0.76" | 760 m || 
|-id=448 bgcolor=#d6d6d6
| 402448 ||  || — || January 23, 2006 || Junk Bond || D. Healy || — || align=right | 4.5 km || 
|-id=449 bgcolor=#fefefe
| 402449 ||  || — || January 23, 2006 || Mount Lemmon || Mount Lemmon Survey || MAS || align=right data-sort-value="0.66" | 660 m || 
|-id=450 bgcolor=#fefefe
| 402450 ||  || — || January 22, 2006 || Mount Lemmon || Mount Lemmon Survey || — || align=right data-sort-value="0.64" | 640 m || 
|-id=451 bgcolor=#d6d6d6
| 402451 ||  || — || November 30, 2005 || Mount Lemmon || Mount Lemmon Survey || — || align=right | 3.1 km || 
|-id=452 bgcolor=#d6d6d6
| 402452 ||  || — || January 22, 2006 || Mount Lemmon || Mount Lemmon Survey || — || align=right | 2.3 km || 
|-id=453 bgcolor=#fefefe
| 402453 ||  || — || January 25, 2006 || Kitt Peak || Spacewatch || — || align=right data-sort-value="0.83" | 830 m || 
|-id=454 bgcolor=#fefefe
| 402454 ||  || — || January 25, 2006 || Kitt Peak || Spacewatch || — || align=right data-sort-value="0.63" | 630 m || 
|-id=455 bgcolor=#d6d6d6
| 402455 ||  || — || December 6, 2005 || Mount Lemmon || Mount Lemmon Survey || EOS || align=right | 1.9 km || 
|-id=456 bgcolor=#d6d6d6
| 402456 ||  || — || January 25, 2006 || Kitt Peak || Spacewatch || EOS || align=right | 3.2 km || 
|-id=457 bgcolor=#fefefe
| 402457 ||  || — || January 26, 2006 || Kitt Peak || Spacewatch || — || align=right | 1.0 km || 
|-id=458 bgcolor=#d6d6d6
| 402458 ||  || — || January 26, 2006 || Kitt Peak || Spacewatch || — || align=right | 3.3 km || 
|-id=459 bgcolor=#d6d6d6
| 402459 ||  || — || January 27, 2006 || Kitt Peak || Spacewatch || — || align=right | 2.8 km || 
|-id=460 bgcolor=#d6d6d6
| 402460 ||  || — || January 7, 2006 || Mount Lemmon || Mount Lemmon Survey || — || align=right | 2.9 km || 
|-id=461 bgcolor=#d6d6d6
| 402461 ||  || — || January 25, 2006 || Kitt Peak || Spacewatch || — || align=right | 2.7 km || 
|-id=462 bgcolor=#d6d6d6
| 402462 ||  || — || January 25, 2006 || Kitt Peak || Spacewatch || — || align=right | 2.7 km || 
|-id=463 bgcolor=#fefefe
| 402463 ||  || — || January 23, 2006 || Catalina || CSS || — || align=right | 1.2 km || 
|-id=464 bgcolor=#fefefe
| 402464 ||  || — || January 25, 2006 || Kitt Peak || Spacewatch || — || align=right data-sort-value="0.73" | 730 m || 
|-id=465 bgcolor=#d6d6d6
| 402465 ||  || — || January 25, 2006 || Kitt Peak || Spacewatch || — || align=right | 3.1 km || 
|-id=466 bgcolor=#d6d6d6
| 402466 ||  || — || January 26, 2006 || Kitt Peak || Spacewatch || — || align=right | 3.4 km || 
|-id=467 bgcolor=#d6d6d6
| 402467 ||  || — || January 26, 2006 || Mount Lemmon || Mount Lemmon Survey || — || align=right | 2.6 km || 
|-id=468 bgcolor=#d6d6d6
| 402468 ||  || — || November 25, 2005 || Mount Lemmon || Mount Lemmon Survey || — || align=right | 2.8 km || 
|-id=469 bgcolor=#fefefe
| 402469 ||  || — || January 28, 2006 || Mount Lemmon || Mount Lemmon Survey || (2076) || align=right data-sort-value="0.72" | 720 m || 
|-id=470 bgcolor=#d6d6d6
| 402470 ||  || — || January 30, 2006 || Kitt Peak || Spacewatch || EOS || align=right | 3.0 km || 
|-id=471 bgcolor=#fefefe
| 402471 ||  || — || January 23, 2006 || Kitt Peak || Spacewatch || — || align=right data-sort-value="0.80" | 800 m || 
|-id=472 bgcolor=#d6d6d6
| 402472 ||  || — || January 31, 2006 || Kitt Peak || Spacewatch || — || align=right | 2.5 km || 
|-id=473 bgcolor=#fefefe
| 402473 ||  || — || January 31, 2006 || Mount Lemmon || Mount Lemmon Survey || — || align=right data-sort-value="0.53" | 530 m || 
|-id=474 bgcolor=#d6d6d6
| 402474 ||  || — || January 30, 2006 || Kitt Peak || Spacewatch || — || align=right | 4.4 km || 
|-id=475 bgcolor=#d6d6d6
| 402475 ||  || — || January 31, 2006 || Kitt Peak || Spacewatch || EOS || align=right | 2.0 km || 
|-id=476 bgcolor=#fefefe
| 402476 ||  || — || January 31, 2006 || Kitt Peak || Spacewatch || — || align=right data-sort-value="0.57" | 570 m || 
|-id=477 bgcolor=#d6d6d6
| 402477 ||  || — || January 31, 2006 || Kitt Peak || Spacewatch || — || align=right | 3.2 km || 
|-id=478 bgcolor=#fefefe
| 402478 ||  || — || January 7, 2006 || Mount Lemmon || Mount Lemmon Survey || — || align=right data-sort-value="0.77" | 770 m || 
|-id=479 bgcolor=#d6d6d6
| 402479 ||  || — || January 23, 2006 || Kitt Peak || Spacewatch || — || align=right | 4.1 km || 
|-id=480 bgcolor=#d6d6d6
| 402480 ||  || — || January 26, 2006 || Kitt Peak || Spacewatch || — || align=right | 4.2 km || 
|-id=481 bgcolor=#fefefe
| 402481 ||  || — || January 30, 2006 || Kitt Peak || Spacewatch || — || align=right data-sort-value="0.54" | 540 m || 
|-id=482 bgcolor=#d6d6d6
| 402482 ||  || — || February 1, 2006 || Kitt Peak || Spacewatch || — || align=right | 3.4 km || 
|-id=483 bgcolor=#fefefe
| 402483 ||  || — || February 1, 2006 || Kitt Peak || Spacewatch || — || align=right data-sort-value="0.99" | 990 m || 
|-id=484 bgcolor=#d6d6d6
| 402484 ||  || — || February 2, 2006 || Kitt Peak || Spacewatch || EOS || align=right | 2.2 km || 
|-id=485 bgcolor=#d6d6d6
| 402485 ||  || — || February 2, 2006 || Kitt Peak || Spacewatch || — || align=right | 3.6 km || 
|-id=486 bgcolor=#fefefe
| 402486 ||  || — || February 2, 2006 || Mount Lemmon || Mount Lemmon Survey || V || align=right data-sort-value="0.58" | 580 m || 
|-id=487 bgcolor=#fefefe
| 402487 ||  || — || January 4, 2006 || Mount Lemmon || Mount Lemmon Survey || — || align=right | 1.0 km || 
|-id=488 bgcolor=#fefefe
| 402488 ||  || — || January 26, 2006 || Catalina || CSS || — || align=right data-sort-value="0.72" | 720 m || 
|-id=489 bgcolor=#fefefe
| 402489 ||  || — || January 10, 2006 || Mount Lemmon || Mount Lemmon Survey || — || align=right data-sort-value="0.76" | 760 m || 
|-id=490 bgcolor=#fefefe
| 402490 ||  || — || January 25, 2006 || Kitt Peak || Spacewatch || — || align=right data-sort-value="0.68" | 680 m || 
|-id=491 bgcolor=#d6d6d6
| 402491 ||  || — || February 5, 2006 || Mount Lemmon || Mount Lemmon Survey || — || align=right | 2.5 km || 
|-id=492 bgcolor=#fefefe
| 402492 ||  || — || February 6, 2006 || Mount Lemmon || Mount Lemmon Survey || — || align=right | 1.2 km || 
|-id=493 bgcolor=#d6d6d6
| 402493 ||  || — || February 20, 2006 || Kitt Peak || Spacewatch || — || align=right | 3.0 km || 
|-id=494 bgcolor=#fefefe
| 402494 ||  || — || February 20, 2006 || Kitt Peak || Spacewatch || — || align=right | 1.1 km || 
|-id=495 bgcolor=#d6d6d6
| 402495 ||  || — || February 21, 2006 || Catalina || CSS || THB || align=right | 4.6 km || 
|-id=496 bgcolor=#fefefe
| 402496 ||  || — || January 31, 2006 || Kitt Peak || Spacewatch || — || align=right data-sort-value="0.98" | 980 m || 
|-id=497 bgcolor=#d6d6d6
| 402497 ||  || — || February 20, 2006 || Kitt Peak || Spacewatch || — || align=right | 2.4 km || 
|-id=498 bgcolor=#fefefe
| 402498 ||  || — || February 20, 2006 || Kitt Peak || Spacewatch || — || align=right data-sort-value="0.75" | 750 m || 
|-id=499 bgcolor=#d6d6d6
| 402499 ||  || — || February 20, 2006 || Mount Lemmon || Mount Lemmon Survey || — || align=right | 3.3 km || 
|-id=500 bgcolor=#d6d6d6
| 402500 ||  || — || February 21, 2006 || Mount Lemmon || Mount Lemmon Survey || — || align=right | 3.9 km || 
|}

402501–402600 

|-bgcolor=#d6d6d6
| 402501 ||  || — || February 22, 2006 || Anderson Mesa || LONEOS || TIR || align=right | 3.9 km || 
|-id=502 bgcolor=#d6d6d6
| 402502 ||  || — || February 20, 2006 || Kitt Peak || Spacewatch || — || align=right | 2.6 km || 
|-id=503 bgcolor=#d6d6d6
| 402503 ||  || — || January 30, 2006 || Kitt Peak || Spacewatch || — || align=right | 3.4 km || 
|-id=504 bgcolor=#fefefe
| 402504 ||  || — || February 24, 2006 || Kitt Peak || Spacewatch || NYS || align=right data-sort-value="0.70" | 700 m || 
|-id=505 bgcolor=#d6d6d6
| 402505 ||  || — || February 24, 2006 || Mount Lemmon || Mount Lemmon Survey || — || align=right | 2.9 km || 
|-id=506 bgcolor=#fefefe
| 402506 ||  || — || February 7, 2006 || Mount Lemmon || Mount Lemmon Survey || — || align=right data-sort-value="0.71" | 710 m || 
|-id=507 bgcolor=#d6d6d6
| 402507 ||  || — || February 24, 2006 || Kitt Peak || Spacewatch || EOS || align=right | 2.7 km || 
|-id=508 bgcolor=#d6d6d6
| 402508 ||  || — || February 24, 2006 || Kitt Peak || Spacewatch || ARM || align=right | 4.2 km || 
|-id=509 bgcolor=#fefefe
| 402509 ||  || — || February 24, 2006 || Kitt Peak || Spacewatch || — || align=right data-sort-value="0.70" | 700 m || 
|-id=510 bgcolor=#fefefe
| 402510 ||  || — || February 25, 2006 || Kitt Peak || Spacewatch || — || align=right data-sort-value="0.81" | 810 m || 
|-id=511 bgcolor=#fefefe
| 402511 ||  || — || February 25, 2006 || Mount Lemmon || Mount Lemmon Survey || — || align=right data-sort-value="0.82" | 820 m || 
|-id=512 bgcolor=#fefefe
| 402512 ||  || — || February 25, 2006 || Kitt Peak || Spacewatch || — || align=right data-sort-value="0.78" | 780 m || 
|-id=513 bgcolor=#d6d6d6
| 402513 ||  || — || February 22, 2006 || Anderson Mesa || LONEOS || Tj (2.99) || align=right | 4.9 km || 
|-id=514 bgcolor=#d6d6d6
| 402514 ||  || — || February 24, 2006 || Mount Lemmon || Mount Lemmon Survey || — || align=right | 4.6 km || 
|-id=515 bgcolor=#fefefe
| 402515 ||  || — || January 31, 2006 || Kitt Peak || Spacewatch || NYS || align=right data-sort-value="0.63" | 630 m || 
|-id=516 bgcolor=#fefefe
| 402516 ||  || — || February 2, 2006 || Mount Lemmon || Mount Lemmon Survey || — || align=right data-sort-value="0.99" | 990 m || 
|-id=517 bgcolor=#fefefe
| 402517 ||  || — || February 25, 2006 || Kitt Peak || Spacewatch || — || align=right data-sort-value="0.74" | 740 m || 
|-id=518 bgcolor=#d6d6d6
| 402518 ||  || — || February 27, 2006 || Kitt Peak || Spacewatch || — || align=right | 3.5 km || 
|-id=519 bgcolor=#d6d6d6
| 402519 ||  || — || January 23, 2006 || Mount Lemmon || Mount Lemmon Survey || — || align=right | 3.7 km || 
|-id=520 bgcolor=#d6d6d6
| 402520 ||  || — || February 27, 2006 || Mount Lemmon || Mount Lemmon Survey || — || align=right | 3.5 km || 
|-id=521 bgcolor=#fefefe
| 402521 ||  || — || February 1, 2006 || Kitt Peak || Spacewatch || — || align=right | 1.1 km || 
|-id=522 bgcolor=#d6d6d6
| 402522 ||  || — || February 4, 2006 || Kitt Peak || Spacewatch || — || align=right | 2.8 km || 
|-id=523 bgcolor=#d6d6d6
| 402523 ||  || — || March 2, 2006 || Kitt Peak || Spacewatch || — || align=right | 3.4 km || 
|-id=524 bgcolor=#d6d6d6
| 402524 ||  || — || March 2, 2006 || Kitt Peak || Spacewatch || — || align=right | 3.9 km || 
|-id=525 bgcolor=#fefefe
| 402525 ||  || — || January 26, 2006 || Mount Lemmon || Mount Lemmon Survey || — || align=right data-sort-value="0.65" | 650 m || 
|-id=526 bgcolor=#d6d6d6
| 402526 ||  || — || March 3, 2006 || Kitt Peak || Spacewatch || — || align=right | 2.2 km || 
|-id=527 bgcolor=#d6d6d6
| 402527 ||  || — || March 3, 2006 || Kitt Peak || Spacewatch || — || align=right | 3.4 km || 
|-id=528 bgcolor=#d6d6d6
| 402528 ||  || — || March 3, 2006 || Kitt Peak || Spacewatch || — || align=right | 3.4 km || 
|-id=529 bgcolor=#fefefe
| 402529 ||  || — || March 3, 2006 || Kitt Peak || Spacewatch || (2076) || align=right data-sort-value="0.75" | 750 m || 
|-id=530 bgcolor=#d6d6d6
| 402530 ||  || — || March 3, 2006 || Kitt Peak || Spacewatch || — || align=right | 3.1 km || 
|-id=531 bgcolor=#fefefe
| 402531 ||  || — || March 5, 2006 || Kitt Peak || Spacewatch || — || align=right data-sort-value="0.65" | 650 m || 
|-id=532 bgcolor=#d6d6d6
| 402532 ||  || — || February 5, 2006 || Mount Lemmon || Mount Lemmon Survey || — || align=right | 2.4 km || 
|-id=533 bgcolor=#fefefe
| 402533 ||  || — || March 2, 2006 || Kitt Peak || Spacewatch || — || align=right data-sort-value="0.71" | 710 m || 
|-id=534 bgcolor=#fefefe
| 402534 ||  || — || March 23, 2006 || Kitt Peak || Spacewatch || MAS || align=right data-sort-value="0.76" | 760 m || 
|-id=535 bgcolor=#fefefe
| 402535 ||  || — || March 24, 2006 || Kitt Peak || Spacewatch || — || align=right data-sort-value="0.76" | 760 m || 
|-id=536 bgcolor=#fefefe
| 402536 ||  || — || March 26, 2006 || Mount Lemmon || Mount Lemmon Survey || — || align=right data-sort-value="0.88" | 880 m || 
|-id=537 bgcolor=#fefefe
| 402537 ||  || — || February 20, 2006 || Mount Lemmon || Mount Lemmon Survey || — || align=right | 1.0 km || 
|-id=538 bgcolor=#fefefe
| 402538 ||  || — || March 25, 2006 || Kitt Peak || Spacewatch || V || align=right data-sort-value="0.67" | 670 m || 
|-id=539 bgcolor=#fefefe
| 402539 ||  || — || January 31, 2006 || Mount Lemmon || Mount Lemmon Survey || — || align=right data-sort-value="0.74" | 740 m || 
|-id=540 bgcolor=#fefefe
| 402540 ||  || — || April 1, 2006 || Siding Spring || SSS || PHO || align=right | 1.1 km || 
|-id=541 bgcolor=#fefefe
| 402541 ||  || — || April 19, 2006 || Kitt Peak || Spacewatch || — || align=right data-sort-value="0.78" | 780 m || 
|-id=542 bgcolor=#fefefe
| 402542 ||  || — || April 24, 2006 || Kitt Peak || Spacewatch || — || align=right data-sort-value="0.68" | 680 m || 
|-id=543 bgcolor=#fefefe
| 402543 ||  || — || April 24, 2006 || Kitt Peak || Spacewatch || NYS || align=right data-sort-value="0.67" | 670 m || 
|-id=544 bgcolor=#d6d6d6
| 402544 ||  || — || April 25, 2006 || Mount Lemmon || Mount Lemmon Survey || — || align=right | 3.4 km || 
|-id=545 bgcolor=#fefefe
| 402545 ||  || — || May 2, 2006 || Mount Lemmon || Mount Lemmon Survey || — || align=right | 1.0 km || 
|-id=546 bgcolor=#fefefe
| 402546 ||  || — || May 2, 2006 || Nyukasa || Mount Nyukasa Stn. || — || align=right data-sort-value="0.89" | 890 m || 
|-id=547 bgcolor=#fefefe
| 402547 ||  || — || May 1, 2006 || Kitt Peak || Spacewatch || — || align=right data-sort-value="0.86" | 860 m || 
|-id=548 bgcolor=#fefefe
| 402548 ||  || — || May 2, 2006 || Kitt Peak || Spacewatch || — || align=right data-sort-value="0.87" | 870 m || 
|-id=549 bgcolor=#fefefe
| 402549 ||  || — || May 7, 2006 || Mount Lemmon || Mount Lemmon Survey || — || align=right data-sort-value="0.83" | 830 m || 
|-id=550 bgcolor=#E9E9E9
| 402550 ||  || — || May 7, 2006 || Mount Lemmon || Mount Lemmon Survey || — || align=right data-sort-value="0.92" | 920 m || 
|-id=551 bgcolor=#fefefe
| 402551 ||  || — || May 22, 2006 || Kitt Peak || Spacewatch || — || align=right data-sort-value="0.98" | 980 m || 
|-id=552 bgcolor=#fefefe
| 402552 ||  || — || May 25, 2006 || Kitt Peak || Spacewatch || — || align=right | 1.1 km || 
|-id=553 bgcolor=#fefefe
| 402553 ||  || — || May 25, 2006 || Kitt Peak || Spacewatch || NYS || align=right data-sort-value="0.67" | 670 m || 
|-id=554 bgcolor=#fefefe
| 402554 ||  || — || May 31, 2006 || Mount Lemmon || Mount Lemmon Survey || — || align=right data-sort-value="0.62" | 620 m || 
|-id=555 bgcolor=#fefefe
| 402555 ||  || — || May 23, 2006 || Mount Lemmon || Mount Lemmon Survey || NYS || align=right data-sort-value="0.83" | 830 m || 
|-id=556 bgcolor=#d6d6d6
| 402556 ||  || — || August 14, 2006 || Siding Spring || SSS || 3:2 || align=right | 4.1 km || 
|-id=557 bgcolor=#fefefe
| 402557 ||  || — || August 17, 2006 || Palomar || NEAT || H || align=right | 1.0 km || 
|-id=558 bgcolor=#E9E9E9
| 402558 ||  || — || August 17, 2006 || Palomar || NEAT || — || align=right data-sort-value="0.94" | 940 m || 
|-id=559 bgcolor=#E9E9E9
| 402559 ||  || — || August 17, 2006 || Palomar || NEAT || — || align=right | 2.3 km || 
|-id=560 bgcolor=#fefefe
| 402560 ||  || — || August 17, 2006 || Palomar || NEAT || H || align=right data-sort-value="0.72" | 720 m || 
|-id=561 bgcolor=#d6d6d6
| 402561 ||  || — || August 17, 2006 || Palomar || NEAT || SHU3:2 || align=right | 6.7 km || 
|-id=562 bgcolor=#fefefe
| 402562 ||  || — || August 20, 2006 || Palomar || NEAT || — || align=right data-sort-value="0.83" | 830 m || 
|-id=563 bgcolor=#E9E9E9
| 402563 ||  || — || August 22, 2006 || Palomar || NEAT || — || align=right | 1.0 km || 
|-id=564 bgcolor=#E9E9E9
| 402564 ||  || — || August 29, 2006 || Catalina || CSS || — || align=right data-sort-value="0.89" | 890 m || 
|-id=565 bgcolor=#E9E9E9
| 402565 ||  || — || September 12, 2006 || Catalina || CSS || — || align=right | 2.5 km || 
|-id=566 bgcolor=#E9E9E9
| 402566 ||  || — || September 11, 2006 || Catalina || CSS || — || align=right data-sort-value="0.99" | 990 m || 
|-id=567 bgcolor=#E9E9E9
| 402567 ||  || — || September 12, 2006 || Catalina || CSS || critical || align=right | 1.4 km || 
|-id=568 bgcolor=#E9E9E9
| 402568 ||  || — || September 14, 2006 || Kitt Peak || Spacewatch || — || align=right data-sort-value="0.62" | 620 m || 
|-id=569 bgcolor=#E9E9E9
| 402569 ||  || — || September 14, 2006 || Catalina || CSS || — || align=right data-sort-value="0.94" | 940 m || 
|-id=570 bgcolor=#E9E9E9
| 402570 ||  || — || September 12, 2006 || Catalina || CSS || MAR || align=right | 1.1 km || 
|-id=571 bgcolor=#E9E9E9
| 402571 ||  || — || September 14, 2006 || Catalina || CSS || — || align=right | 2.1 km || 
|-id=572 bgcolor=#E9E9E9
| 402572 ||  || — || September 14, 2006 || Kitt Peak || Spacewatch || — || align=right data-sort-value="0.90" | 900 m || 
|-id=573 bgcolor=#E9E9E9
| 402573 ||  || — || September 14, 2006 || Kitt Peak || Spacewatch || GEF || align=right | 1.2 km || 
|-id=574 bgcolor=#E9E9E9
| 402574 ||  || — || September 14, 2006 || Kitt Peak || Spacewatch || — || align=right | 1.3 km || 
|-id=575 bgcolor=#E9E9E9
| 402575 ||  || — || September 14, 2006 || Kitt Peak || Spacewatch || — || align=right | 1.9 km || 
|-id=576 bgcolor=#E9E9E9
| 402576 ||  || — || September 14, 2006 || Kitt Peak || Spacewatch || — || align=right data-sort-value="0.98" | 980 m || 
|-id=577 bgcolor=#E9E9E9
| 402577 ||  || — || September 15, 2006 || Kitt Peak || Spacewatch || — || align=right | 1.5 km || 
|-id=578 bgcolor=#E9E9E9
| 402578 ||  || — || September 15, 2006 || Kitt Peak || Spacewatch || — || align=right | 1.8 km || 
|-id=579 bgcolor=#E9E9E9
| 402579 ||  || — || September 15, 2006 || Kitt Peak || Spacewatch || — || align=right data-sort-value="0.91" | 910 m || 
|-id=580 bgcolor=#E9E9E9
| 402580 ||  || — || September 15, 2006 || Kitt Peak || Spacewatch || — || align=right | 1.2 km || 
|-id=581 bgcolor=#E9E9E9
| 402581 ||  || — || September 15, 2006 || Kitt Peak || Spacewatch || fast? || align=right | 1.4 km || 
|-id=582 bgcolor=#E9E9E9
| 402582 ||  || — || September 15, 2006 || Kitt Peak || Spacewatch || — || align=right data-sort-value="0.82" | 820 m || 
|-id=583 bgcolor=#E9E9E9
| 402583 ||  || — || September 15, 2006 || Kitt Peak || Spacewatch || critical || align=right | 1.1 km || 
|-id=584 bgcolor=#E9E9E9
| 402584 ||  || — || September 14, 2006 || Catalina || CSS || — || align=right | 1.1 km || 
|-id=585 bgcolor=#E9E9E9
| 402585 ||  || — || September 15, 2006 || Kitt Peak || Spacewatch || — || align=right | 2.1 km || 
|-id=586 bgcolor=#E9E9E9
| 402586 ||  || — || September 17, 2006 || Catalina || CSS || KON || align=right | 2.3 km || 
|-id=587 bgcolor=#E9E9E9
| 402587 ||  || — || August 29, 2006 || Kitt Peak || Spacewatch || — || align=right | 1.1 km || 
|-id=588 bgcolor=#E9E9E9
| 402588 ||  || — || September 17, 2006 || Kitt Peak || Spacewatch || — || align=right data-sort-value="0.83" | 830 m || 
|-id=589 bgcolor=#E9E9E9
| 402589 ||  || — || September 16, 2006 || Catalina || CSS || (5) || align=right data-sort-value="0.74" | 740 m || 
|-id=590 bgcolor=#E9E9E9
| 402590 ||  || — || September 18, 2006 || Catalina || CSS || — || align=right data-sort-value="0.78" | 780 m || 
|-id=591 bgcolor=#E9E9E9
| 402591 ||  || — || September 23, 2006 || Wildberg || R. Apitzsch || — || align=right | 1.3 km || 
|-id=592 bgcolor=#E9E9E9
| 402592 ||  || — || September 18, 2006 || Kitt Peak || Spacewatch || — || align=right | 1.3 km || 
|-id=593 bgcolor=#E9E9E9
| 402593 ||  || — || September 18, 2006 || Kitt Peak || Spacewatch || — || align=right data-sort-value="0.96" | 960 m || 
|-id=594 bgcolor=#E9E9E9
| 402594 ||  || — || September 18, 2006 || Kitt Peak || Spacewatch || — || align=right | 2.1 km || 
|-id=595 bgcolor=#E9E9E9
| 402595 ||  || — || September 18, 2006 || Kitt Peak || Spacewatch || — || align=right | 1.1 km || 
|-id=596 bgcolor=#E9E9E9
| 402596 ||  || — || September 19, 2006 || Kitt Peak || Spacewatch || (5) || align=right data-sort-value="0.85" | 850 m || 
|-id=597 bgcolor=#E9E9E9
| 402597 ||  || — || September 19, 2006 || Anderson Mesa || LONEOS || KON || align=right | 2.1 km || 
|-id=598 bgcolor=#E9E9E9
| 402598 ||  || — || September 19, 2006 || Kitt Peak || Spacewatch || — || align=right data-sort-value="0.87" | 870 m || 
|-id=599 bgcolor=#E9E9E9
| 402599 ||  || — || September 19, 2006 || Kitt Peak || Spacewatch || — || align=right | 1.3 km || 
|-id=600 bgcolor=#E9E9E9
| 402600 ||  || — || September 19, 2006 || Kitt Peak || Spacewatch || — || align=right | 1.4 km || 
|}

402601–402700 

|-bgcolor=#E9E9E9
| 402601 ||  || — || September 20, 2006 || Anderson Mesa || LONEOS || — || align=right | 1.5 km || 
|-id=602 bgcolor=#E9E9E9
| 402602 ||  || — || September 23, 2006 || Kitt Peak || Spacewatch || — || align=right data-sort-value="0.78" | 780 m || 
|-id=603 bgcolor=#E9E9E9
| 402603 ||  || — || September 23, 2006 || Kitt Peak || Spacewatch || — || align=right | 1.5 km || 
|-id=604 bgcolor=#E9E9E9
| 402604 ||  || — || September 25, 2006 || Kitt Peak || Spacewatch || — || align=right | 2.1 km || 
|-id=605 bgcolor=#E9E9E9
| 402605 ||  || — || September 25, 2006 || Kitt Peak || Spacewatch || — || align=right | 1.2 km || 
|-id=606 bgcolor=#E9E9E9
| 402606 ||  || — || September 26, 2006 || Kitt Peak || Spacewatch || — || align=right data-sort-value="0.90" | 900 m || 
|-id=607 bgcolor=#E9E9E9
| 402607 ||  || — || September 26, 2006 || Kitt Peak || Spacewatch || BRG || align=right | 1.6 km || 
|-id=608 bgcolor=#E9E9E9
| 402608 ||  || — || September 27, 2006 || Mount Lemmon || Mount Lemmon Survey || — || align=right | 1.4 km || 
|-id=609 bgcolor=#E9E9E9
| 402609 ||  || — || September 21, 2006 || Wildberg || R. Apitzsch || — || align=right data-sort-value="0.89" | 890 m || 
|-id=610 bgcolor=#E9E9E9
| 402610 ||  || — || September 26, 2006 || Mount Lemmon || Mount Lemmon Survey || — || align=right data-sort-value="0.82" | 820 m || 
|-id=611 bgcolor=#E9E9E9
| 402611 ||  || — || September 26, 2006 || Kitt Peak || Spacewatch || — || align=right | 1.3 km || 
|-id=612 bgcolor=#E9E9E9
| 402612 ||  || — || September 19, 2006 || Kitt Peak || Spacewatch || — || align=right | 1.8 km || 
|-id=613 bgcolor=#E9E9E9
| 402613 ||  || — || September 27, 2006 || Mount Lemmon || Mount Lemmon Survey || (5) || align=right | 1.0 km || 
|-id=614 bgcolor=#E9E9E9
| 402614 ||  || — || September 29, 2006 || Anderson Mesa || LONEOS || (5) || align=right data-sort-value="0.73" | 730 m || 
|-id=615 bgcolor=#E9E9E9
| 402615 ||  || — || September 17, 2006 || Kitt Peak || Spacewatch || — || align=right | 1.3 km || 
|-id=616 bgcolor=#E9E9E9
| 402616 ||  || — || September 27, 2006 || Kitt Peak || Spacewatch || — || align=right | 1.2 km || 
|-id=617 bgcolor=#E9E9E9
| 402617 ||  || — || September 27, 2006 || Kitt Peak || Spacewatch || (5) || align=right data-sort-value="0.56" | 560 m || 
|-id=618 bgcolor=#E9E9E9
| 402618 ||  || — || September 27, 2006 || Kitt Peak || Spacewatch || — || align=right | 1.3 km || 
|-id=619 bgcolor=#E9E9E9
| 402619 ||  || — || September 28, 2006 || Kitt Peak || Spacewatch || — || align=right data-sort-value="0.99" | 990 m || 
|-id=620 bgcolor=#E9E9E9
| 402620 ||  || — || September 28, 2006 || Kitt Peak || Spacewatch || — || align=right | 1.4 km || 
|-id=621 bgcolor=#E9E9E9
| 402621 ||  || — || September 30, 2006 || Catalina || CSS || — || align=right | 1.1 km || 
|-id=622 bgcolor=#E9E9E9
| 402622 ||  || — || September 18, 2006 || Kitt Peak || Spacewatch || — || align=right | 1.2 km || 
|-id=623 bgcolor=#E9E9E9
| 402623 ||  || — || September 17, 2006 || Kitt Peak || Spacewatch || — || align=right data-sort-value="0.94" | 940 m || 
|-id=624 bgcolor=#E9E9E9
| 402624 ||  || — || September 28, 2006 || Mount Lemmon || Mount Lemmon Survey || — || align=right | 1.3 km || 
|-id=625 bgcolor=#E9E9E9
| 402625 ||  || — || October 11, 2006 || Kitt Peak || Spacewatch || — || align=right data-sort-value="0.86" | 860 m || 
|-id=626 bgcolor=#E9E9E9
| 402626 ||  || — || October 11, 2006 || Kitt Peak || Spacewatch || — || align=right | 1.5 km || 
|-id=627 bgcolor=#E9E9E9
| 402627 ||  || — || October 12, 2006 || Kitt Peak || Spacewatch || — || align=right | 1.2 km || 
|-id=628 bgcolor=#E9E9E9
| 402628 ||  || — || October 12, 2006 || Kitt Peak || Spacewatch || — || align=right | 1.2 km || 
|-id=629 bgcolor=#E9E9E9
| 402629 ||  || — || September 25, 2006 || Mount Lemmon || Mount Lemmon Survey || — || align=right data-sort-value="0.90" | 900 m || 
|-id=630 bgcolor=#E9E9E9
| 402630 ||  || — || October 12, 2006 || Kitt Peak || Spacewatch || — || align=right | 1.4 km || 
|-id=631 bgcolor=#E9E9E9
| 402631 ||  || — || October 12, 2006 || Palomar || NEAT || — || align=right data-sort-value="0.87" | 870 m || 
|-id=632 bgcolor=#E9E9E9
| 402632 ||  || — || September 25, 2006 || Mount Lemmon || Mount Lemmon Survey || — || align=right data-sort-value="0.86" | 860 m || 
|-id=633 bgcolor=#E9E9E9
| 402633 ||  || — || October 13, 2006 || Kitt Peak || Spacewatch || — || align=right | 1.0 km || 
|-id=634 bgcolor=#E9E9E9
| 402634 ||  || — || October 13, 2006 || Kitt Peak || Spacewatch || — || align=right | 2.1 km || 
|-id=635 bgcolor=#E9E9E9
| 402635 ||  || — || October 12, 2006 || Kitt Peak || Spacewatch || — || align=right | 1.4 km || 
|-id=636 bgcolor=#E9E9E9
| 402636 ||  || — || October 15, 2006 || Kitt Peak || Spacewatch || — || align=right data-sort-value="0.90" | 900 m || 
|-id=637 bgcolor=#E9E9E9
| 402637 ||  || — || September 30, 2006 || Mount Lemmon || Mount Lemmon Survey || WIT || align=right | 1.0 km || 
|-id=638 bgcolor=#E9E9E9
| 402638 ||  || — || October 1, 2006 || Apache Point || A. C. Becker || — || align=right | 2.4 km || 
|-id=639 bgcolor=#E9E9E9
| 402639 ||  || — || October 3, 2006 || Apache Point || A. C. Becker || — || align=right | 1.7 km || 
|-id=640 bgcolor=#E9E9E9
| 402640 ||  || — || October 3, 2006 || Apache Point || A. C. Becker || — || align=right | 2.8 km || 
|-id=641 bgcolor=#d6d6d6
| 402641 ||  || — || October 11, 2006 || Apache Point || A. C. Becker || — || align=right | 3.7 km || 
|-id=642 bgcolor=#E9E9E9
| 402642 ||  || — || October 3, 2006 || Mount Lemmon || Mount Lemmon Survey || — || align=right | 1.9 km || 
|-id=643 bgcolor=#E9E9E9
| 402643 ||  || — || October 4, 2006 || Mount Lemmon || Mount Lemmon Survey || — || align=right | 1.2 km || 
|-id=644 bgcolor=#E9E9E9
| 402644 ||  || — || October 4, 2006 || Mount Lemmon || Mount Lemmon Survey || — || align=right | 2.1 km || 
|-id=645 bgcolor=#E9E9E9
| 402645 ||  || — || October 16, 2006 || Catalina || CSS || — || align=right | 1.4 km || 
|-id=646 bgcolor=#E9E9E9
| 402646 ||  || — || October 17, 2006 || Mount Lemmon || Mount Lemmon Survey || — || align=right | 2.7 km || 
|-id=647 bgcolor=#E9E9E9
| 402647 ||  || — || October 19, 2006 || Calvin-Rehoboth || L. A. Molnar || — || align=right | 1.1 km || 
|-id=648 bgcolor=#E9E9E9
| 402648 ||  || — || September 25, 2006 || Kitt Peak || Spacewatch || — || align=right | 1.3 km || 
|-id=649 bgcolor=#E9E9E9
| 402649 ||  || — || October 16, 2006 || Kitt Peak || Spacewatch || — || align=right data-sort-value="0.90" | 900 m || 
|-id=650 bgcolor=#E9E9E9
| 402650 ||  || — || October 16, 2006 || Kitt Peak || Spacewatch || — || align=right | 1.3 km || 
|-id=651 bgcolor=#E9E9E9
| 402651 ||  || — || October 17, 2006 || Kitt Peak || Spacewatch || — || align=right | 1.3 km || 
|-id=652 bgcolor=#E9E9E9
| 402652 ||  || — || October 16, 2006 || Kitt Peak || Spacewatch || MIS || align=right | 2.0 km || 
|-id=653 bgcolor=#E9E9E9
| 402653 ||  || — || September 28, 2006 || Mount Lemmon || Mount Lemmon Survey || — || align=right | 1.1 km || 
|-id=654 bgcolor=#E9E9E9
| 402654 ||  || — || October 17, 2006 || Kitt Peak || Spacewatch || — || align=right | 1.9 km || 
|-id=655 bgcolor=#E9E9E9
| 402655 ||  || — || October 17, 2006 || Mount Lemmon || Mount Lemmon Survey || NEM || align=right | 2.3 km || 
|-id=656 bgcolor=#E9E9E9
| 402656 ||  || — || October 17, 2006 || Mount Lemmon || Mount Lemmon Survey || — || align=right | 1.6 km || 
|-id=657 bgcolor=#E9E9E9
| 402657 ||  || — || October 18, 2006 || Kitt Peak || Spacewatch || — || align=right | 1.3 km || 
|-id=658 bgcolor=#E9E9E9
| 402658 ||  || — || October 2, 2006 || Mount Lemmon || Mount Lemmon Survey || — || align=right | 1.4 km || 
|-id=659 bgcolor=#E9E9E9
| 402659 ||  || — || October 18, 2006 || Kitt Peak || Spacewatch ||  || align=right | 1.6 km || 
|-id=660 bgcolor=#E9E9E9
| 402660 ||  || — || October 18, 2006 || Kitt Peak || Spacewatch || — || align=right | 1.5 km || 
|-id=661 bgcolor=#E9E9E9
| 402661 ||  || — || October 19, 2006 || Kitt Peak || Spacewatch || — || align=right | 1.6 km || 
|-id=662 bgcolor=#E9E9E9
| 402662 ||  || — || October 21, 2006 || Catalina || CSS || — || align=right data-sort-value="0.90" | 900 m || 
|-id=663 bgcolor=#E9E9E9
| 402663 ||  || — || October 21, 2006 || Mount Lemmon || Mount Lemmon Survey || — || align=right | 1.5 km || 
|-id=664 bgcolor=#E9E9E9
| 402664 ||  || — || October 21, 2006 || Mount Lemmon || Mount Lemmon Survey || — || align=right | 1.5 km || 
|-id=665 bgcolor=#E9E9E9
| 402665 ||  || — || October 16, 2006 || Catalina || CSS || — || align=right | 1.3 km || 
|-id=666 bgcolor=#E9E9E9
| 402666 ||  || — || October 19, 2006 || Catalina || CSS || — || align=right data-sort-value="0.98" | 980 m || 
|-id=667 bgcolor=#E9E9E9
| 402667 ||  || — || October 19, 2006 || Palomar || NEAT || — || align=right | 1.4 km || 
|-id=668 bgcolor=#E9E9E9
| 402668 ||  || — || October 20, 2006 || Kitt Peak || Spacewatch || — || align=right | 2.0 km || 
|-id=669 bgcolor=#E9E9E9
| 402669 ||  || — || October 23, 2006 || Kitt Peak || Spacewatch || — || align=right | 2.0 km || 
|-id=670 bgcolor=#E9E9E9
| 402670 ||  || — || October 17, 2006 || Catalina || CSS || (5) || align=right data-sort-value="0.74" | 740 m || 
|-id=671 bgcolor=#E9E9E9
| 402671 ||  || — || October 23, 2006 || Palomar || NEAT || (194) || align=right | 1.9 km || 
|-id=672 bgcolor=#E9E9E9
| 402672 ||  || — || October 23, 2006 || Catalina || CSS || — || align=right | 2.6 km || 
|-id=673 bgcolor=#E9E9E9
| 402673 ||  || — || October 27, 2006 || Catalina || CSS || — || align=right | 1.6 km || 
|-id=674 bgcolor=#E9E9E9
| 402674 ||  || — || October 27, 2006 || Kitt Peak || Spacewatch || GEF || align=right | 3.0 km || 
|-id=675 bgcolor=#E9E9E9
| 402675 ||  || — || October 28, 2006 || Mount Lemmon || Mount Lemmon Survey || AST || align=right | 1.3 km || 
|-id=676 bgcolor=#E9E9E9
| 402676 ||  || — || October 20, 2006 || Kitt Peak || Spacewatch || — || align=right data-sort-value="0.86" | 860 m || 
|-id=677 bgcolor=#E9E9E9
| 402677 ||  || — || October 28, 2006 || Kitt Peak || Spacewatch || — || align=right | 1.6 km || 
|-id=678 bgcolor=#E9E9E9
| 402678 ||  || — || October 28, 2006 || Kitt Peak || Spacewatch || — || align=right | 1.5 km || 
|-id=679 bgcolor=#E9E9E9
| 402679 ||  || — || October 16, 2006 || Kitt Peak || Spacewatch || — || align=right | 1.4 km || 
|-id=680 bgcolor=#E9E9E9
| 402680 ||  || — || October 20, 2006 || Kitt Peak || Spacewatch || MIS || align=right | 2.4 km || 
|-id=681 bgcolor=#E9E9E9
| 402681 ||  || — || October 21, 2006 || Catalina || CSS || — || align=right | 2.9 km || 
|-id=682 bgcolor=#E9E9E9
| 402682 ||  || — || October 23, 2006 || Mount Lemmon || Mount Lemmon Survey || — || align=right | 1.7 km || 
|-id=683 bgcolor=#E9E9E9
| 402683 ||  || — || October 19, 2006 || Catalina || CSS || — || align=right | 2.7 km || 
|-id=684 bgcolor=#E9E9E9
| 402684 ||  || — || October 19, 2006 || Catalina || CSS || — || align=right | 1.3 km || 
|-id=685 bgcolor=#E9E9E9
| 402685 ||  || — || November 9, 2006 || Dax || Dax Obs. || (5) || align=right data-sort-value="0.80" | 800 m || 
|-id=686 bgcolor=#E9E9E9
| 402686 ||  || — || November 11, 2006 || Catalina || CSS || — || align=right | 1.3 km || 
|-id=687 bgcolor=#E9E9E9
| 402687 ||  || — || November 11, 2006 || Mount Lemmon || Mount Lemmon Survey || — || align=right | 1.3 km || 
|-id=688 bgcolor=#E9E9E9
| 402688 ||  || — || November 10, 2006 || Kitt Peak || Spacewatch || — || align=right | 1.4 km || 
|-id=689 bgcolor=#E9E9E9
| 402689 ||  || — || October 27, 2006 || Mount Lemmon || Mount Lemmon Survey || — || align=right | 1.4 km || 
|-id=690 bgcolor=#E9E9E9
| 402690 ||  || — || November 11, 2006 || Catalina || CSS || — || align=right data-sort-value="0.78" | 780 m || 
|-id=691 bgcolor=#E9E9E9
| 402691 ||  || — || November 12, 2006 || Mount Lemmon || Mount Lemmon Survey || critical || align=right | 1.1 km || 
|-id=692 bgcolor=#E9E9E9
| 402692 ||  || — || October 31, 2006 || Mount Lemmon || Mount Lemmon Survey || — || align=right | 2.3 km || 
|-id=693 bgcolor=#E9E9E9
| 402693 ||  || — || November 10, 2006 || Socorro || LINEAR || — || align=right | 1.6 km || 
|-id=694 bgcolor=#E9E9E9
| 402694 ||  || — || November 10, 2006 || Kitt Peak || Spacewatch || — || align=right | 1.4 km || 
|-id=695 bgcolor=#E9E9E9
| 402695 ||  || — || November 11, 2006 || Kitt Peak || Spacewatch || — || align=right | 1.3 km || 
|-id=696 bgcolor=#E9E9E9
| 402696 ||  || — || September 28, 2006 || Mount Lemmon || Mount Lemmon Survey || — || align=right | 1.4 km || 
|-id=697 bgcolor=#fefefe
| 402697 ||  || — || October 28, 2006 || Mount Lemmon || Mount Lemmon Survey || NYS || align=right data-sort-value="0.54" | 540 m || 
|-id=698 bgcolor=#E9E9E9
| 402698 ||  || — || November 11, 2006 || Kitt Peak || Spacewatch || — || align=right | 1.9 km || 
|-id=699 bgcolor=#E9E9E9
| 402699 ||  || — || November 11, 2006 || Kitt Peak || Spacewatch || — || align=right | 1.2 km || 
|-id=700 bgcolor=#E9E9E9
| 402700 ||  || — || November 13, 2006 || Kitt Peak || Spacewatch || — || align=right | 1.5 km || 
|}

402701–402800 

|-bgcolor=#E9E9E9
| 402701 ||  || — || November 14, 2006 || Catalina || CSS || — || align=right | 1.4 km || 
|-id=702 bgcolor=#E9E9E9
| 402702 ||  || — || September 27, 2006 || Mount Lemmon || Mount Lemmon Survey || (5) || align=right data-sort-value="0.90" | 900 m || 
|-id=703 bgcolor=#E9E9E9
| 402703 ||  || — || November 11, 2006 || Catalina || CSS || — || align=right data-sort-value="0.94" | 940 m || 
|-id=704 bgcolor=#E9E9E9
| 402704 ||  || — || November 13, 2006 || Catalina || CSS || — || align=right data-sort-value="0.98" | 980 m || 
|-id=705 bgcolor=#E9E9E9
| 402705 ||  || — || November 13, 2006 || Kitt Peak || Spacewatch || (5) || align=right data-sort-value="0.93" | 930 m || 
|-id=706 bgcolor=#E9E9E9
| 402706 ||  || — || November 13, 2006 || Kitt Peak || Spacewatch || EUN || align=right | 2.3 km || 
|-id=707 bgcolor=#E9E9E9
| 402707 ||  || — || November 2, 2006 || Catalina || CSS || MAR || align=right | 1.2 km || 
|-id=708 bgcolor=#E9E9E9
| 402708 ||  || — || November 15, 2006 || Kitt Peak || Spacewatch || — || align=right | 1.9 km || 
|-id=709 bgcolor=#E9E9E9
| 402709 ||  || — || September 27, 2006 || Mount Lemmon || Mount Lemmon Survey || — || align=right | 1.9 km || 
|-id=710 bgcolor=#E9E9E9
| 402710 ||  || — || November 15, 2006 || Mount Lemmon || Mount Lemmon Survey || PAD || align=right | 1.5 km || 
|-id=711 bgcolor=#E9E9E9
| 402711 ||  || — || September 19, 2006 || Catalina || CSS || — || align=right | 1.1 km || 
|-id=712 bgcolor=#E9E9E9
| 402712 ||  || — || November 9, 2006 || Palomar || NEAT || — || align=right | 1.2 km || 
|-id=713 bgcolor=#E9E9E9
| 402713 ||  || — || November 13, 2006 || Apache Point || SDSS || — || align=right | 1.3 km || 
|-id=714 bgcolor=#E9E9E9
| 402714 ||  || — || November 16, 2006 || Kitt Peak || Spacewatch || — || align=right | 2.9 km || 
|-id=715 bgcolor=#E9E9E9
| 402715 ||  || — || November 16, 2006 || Mount Lemmon || Mount Lemmon Survey || — || align=right | 1.6 km || 
|-id=716 bgcolor=#E9E9E9
| 402716 ||  || — || November 1, 2006 || Mount Lemmon || Mount Lemmon Survey || — || align=right | 1.9 km || 
|-id=717 bgcolor=#E9E9E9
| 402717 ||  || — || November 17, 2006 || Mount Lemmon || Mount Lemmon Survey || — || align=right | 1.7 km || 
|-id=718 bgcolor=#E9E9E9
| 402718 ||  || — || September 30, 2006 || Mount Lemmon || Mount Lemmon Survey || — || align=right | 1.3 km || 
|-id=719 bgcolor=#E9E9E9
| 402719 ||  || — || November 16, 2006 || Kitt Peak || Spacewatch || — || align=right | 1.7 km || 
|-id=720 bgcolor=#E9E9E9
| 402720 ||  || — || November 16, 2006 || Kitt Peak || Spacewatch || — || align=right | 1.3 km || 
|-id=721 bgcolor=#E9E9E9
| 402721 ||  || — || November 16, 2006 || Kitt Peak || Spacewatch || — || align=right | 2.2 km || 
|-id=722 bgcolor=#d6d6d6
| 402722 ||  || — || November 16, 2006 || Mount Lemmon || Mount Lemmon Survey || — || align=right | 3.2 km || 
|-id=723 bgcolor=#E9E9E9
| 402723 ||  || — || November 16, 2006 || Kitt Peak || Spacewatch || — || align=right | 1.5 km || 
|-id=724 bgcolor=#E9E9E9
| 402724 ||  || — || November 17, 2006 || Kitt Peak || Spacewatch || EUN || align=right | 1.6 km || 
|-id=725 bgcolor=#E9E9E9
| 402725 ||  || — || October 31, 2006 || Mount Lemmon || Mount Lemmon Survey || — || align=right | 2.0 km || 
|-id=726 bgcolor=#E9E9E9
| 402726 ||  || — || November 18, 2006 || Socorro || LINEAR || — || align=right | 2.0 km || 
|-id=727 bgcolor=#E9E9E9
| 402727 ||  || — || November 11, 2006 || Kitt Peak || Spacewatch || — || align=right | 1.9 km || 
|-id=728 bgcolor=#d6d6d6
| 402728 ||  || — || November 21, 2006 || Mount Lemmon || Mount Lemmon Survey || — || align=right | 3.8 km || 
|-id=729 bgcolor=#E9E9E9
| 402729 ||  || — || November 22, 2006 || Kitt Peak || Spacewatch || HOF || align=right | 2.6 km || 
|-id=730 bgcolor=#E9E9E9
| 402730 ||  || — || November 18, 2006 || Kitt Peak || Spacewatch || — || align=right | 1.2 km || 
|-id=731 bgcolor=#E9E9E9
| 402731 ||  || — || November 19, 2006 || Kitt Peak || Spacewatch || — || align=right | 1.8 km || 
|-id=732 bgcolor=#E9E9E9
| 402732 ||  || — || November 22, 2006 || Kitt Peak || Spacewatch || HOF || align=right | 2.5 km || 
|-id=733 bgcolor=#E9E9E9
| 402733 ||  || — || November 22, 2006 || Kitt Peak || Spacewatch || — || align=right | 1.9 km || 
|-id=734 bgcolor=#E9E9E9
| 402734 ||  || — || November 22, 2006 || Socorro || LINEAR || — || align=right | 1.5 km || 
|-id=735 bgcolor=#E9E9E9
| 402735 ||  || — || October 23, 2006 || Mount Lemmon || Mount Lemmon Survey || GEF || align=right | 1.2 km || 
|-id=736 bgcolor=#E9E9E9
| 402736 ||  || — || March 23, 2004 || Kitt Peak || Spacewatch || AST || align=right | 1.9 km || 
|-id=737 bgcolor=#E9E9E9
| 402737 ||  || — || November 23, 2006 || Kitt Peak || Spacewatch || — || align=right | 3.1 km || 
|-id=738 bgcolor=#E9E9E9
| 402738 ||  || — || November 23, 2006 || Mount Lemmon || Mount Lemmon Survey || — || align=right | 1.3 km || 
|-id=739 bgcolor=#E9E9E9
| 402739 ||  || — || November 20, 2006 || Kitt Peak || Spacewatch || ADE || align=right | 2.5 km || 
|-id=740 bgcolor=#d6d6d6
| 402740 ||  || — || November 24, 2006 || Mount Lemmon || Mount Lemmon Survey || — || align=right | 3.3 km || 
|-id=741 bgcolor=#E9E9E9
| 402741 || 2006 XL || — || December 9, 2006 || 7300 Observatory || W. K. Y. Yeung || — || align=right | 2.6 km || 
|-id=742 bgcolor=#E9E9E9
| 402742 ||  || — || December 8, 2006 || Palomar || NEAT || — || align=right | 1.2 km || 
|-id=743 bgcolor=#E9E9E9
| 402743 ||  || — || December 10, 2006 || Kitt Peak || Spacewatch || — || align=right | 1.3 km || 
|-id=744 bgcolor=#E9E9E9
| 402744 ||  || — || December 10, 2006 || Anderson Mesa || LONEOS || — || align=right | 1.0 km || 
|-id=745 bgcolor=#E9E9E9
| 402745 ||  || — || December 12, 2006 || Catalina || CSS || ADE || align=right | 2.3 km || 
|-id=746 bgcolor=#E9E9E9
| 402746 ||  || — || December 9, 2006 || Kitt Peak || Spacewatch || AGN || align=right | 1.00 km || 
|-id=747 bgcolor=#E9E9E9
| 402747 ||  || — || December 9, 2006 || Kitt Peak || Spacewatch || — || align=right | 1.9 km || 
|-id=748 bgcolor=#E9E9E9
| 402748 ||  || — || December 11, 2006 || Kitt Peak || Spacewatch || — || align=right | 2.2 km || 
|-id=749 bgcolor=#E9E9E9
| 402749 ||  || — || December 13, 2006 || Catalina || CSS || — || align=right | 1.5 km || 
|-id=750 bgcolor=#E9E9E9
| 402750 ||  || — || December 15, 2006 || Kitt Peak || Spacewatch || — || align=right | 2.4 km || 
|-id=751 bgcolor=#E9E9E9
| 402751 ||  || — || December 18, 2006 || Nyukasa || Mount Nyukasa Stn. || — || align=right | 1.7 km || 
|-id=752 bgcolor=#d6d6d6
| 402752 ||  || — || December 14, 2006 || Mount Lemmon || Mount Lemmon Survey || — || align=right | 3.1 km || 
|-id=753 bgcolor=#E9E9E9
| 402753 ||  || — || December 25, 2006 || Junk Bond || D. Healy || — || align=right | 1.6 km || 
|-id=754 bgcolor=#d6d6d6
| 402754 ||  || — || December 23, 2006 || Mount Lemmon || Mount Lemmon Survey || — || align=right | 3.3 km || 
|-id=755 bgcolor=#E9E9E9
| 402755 ||  || — || December 21, 2006 || Kitt Peak || Spacewatch || — || align=right | 1.5 km || 
|-id=756 bgcolor=#FA8072
| 402756 ||  || — || December 21, 2006 || Kitt Peak || Spacewatch || — || align=right | 1.4 km || 
|-id=757 bgcolor=#d6d6d6
| 402757 ||  || — || December 25, 2006 || Kitt Peak || Spacewatch || — || align=right | 4.0 km || 
|-id=758 bgcolor=#d6d6d6
| 402758 ||  || — || January 10, 2007 || Nyukasa || Mount Nyukasa Stn. || — || align=right | 3.2 km || 
|-id=759 bgcolor=#E9E9E9
| 402759 ||  || — || January 9, 2007 || Mount Lemmon || Mount Lemmon Survey || — || align=right | 2.3 km || 
|-id=760 bgcolor=#E9E9E9
| 402760 ||  || — || December 14, 2006 || Mount Lemmon || Mount Lemmon Survey || DOR || align=right | 2.4 km || 
|-id=761 bgcolor=#E9E9E9
| 402761 ||  || — || January 15, 2007 || Catalina || CSS || — || align=right | 1.8 km || 
|-id=762 bgcolor=#d6d6d6
| 402762 ||  || — || January 17, 2007 || Kitt Peak || Spacewatch || EOS || align=right | 1.9 km || 
|-id=763 bgcolor=#E9E9E9
| 402763 ||  || — || January 17, 2007 || Kitt Peak || Spacewatch || GEF || align=right | 1.1 km || 
|-id=764 bgcolor=#d6d6d6
| 402764 ||  || — || January 24, 2007 || Socorro || LINEAR || — || align=right | 3.5 km || 
|-id=765 bgcolor=#d6d6d6
| 402765 ||  || — || December 20, 2006 || Mount Lemmon || Mount Lemmon Survey || — || align=right | 2.6 km || 
|-id=766 bgcolor=#d6d6d6
| 402766 ||  || — || November 23, 2006 || Mount Lemmon || Mount Lemmon Survey || EOS || align=right | 1.8 km || 
|-id=767 bgcolor=#d6d6d6
| 402767 ||  || — || January 26, 2007 || Kitt Peak || Spacewatch || — || align=right | 2.4 km || 
|-id=768 bgcolor=#E9E9E9
| 402768 ||  || — || September 24, 2005 || Kitt Peak || Spacewatch || AGN || align=right | 1.3 km || 
|-id=769 bgcolor=#d6d6d6
| 402769 ||  || — || January 24, 2007 || Kitt Peak || Spacewatch || ARM || align=right | 4.0 km || 
|-id=770 bgcolor=#E9E9E9
| 402770 ||  || — || January 9, 2007 || Kitt Peak || Spacewatch || — || align=right | 2.3 km || 
|-id=771 bgcolor=#d6d6d6
| 402771 ||  || — || January 17, 2007 || Kitt Peak || Spacewatch || — || align=right | 2.3 km || 
|-id=772 bgcolor=#d6d6d6
| 402772 ||  || — || January 25, 2007 || Kitt Peak || Spacewatch || — || align=right | 2.8 km || 
|-id=773 bgcolor=#d6d6d6
| 402773 ||  || — || January 25, 2007 || Kitt Peak || Spacewatch || — || align=right | 2.5 km || 
|-id=774 bgcolor=#d6d6d6
| 402774 ||  || — || January 27, 2007 || Kitt Peak || Spacewatch || — || align=right | 2.7 km || 
|-id=775 bgcolor=#d6d6d6
| 402775 ||  || — || February 6, 2007 || Kitt Peak || Spacewatch || — || align=right | 2.2 km || 
|-id=776 bgcolor=#fefefe
| 402776 ||  || — || January 27, 2007 || Kitt Peak || Spacewatch || — || align=right data-sort-value="0.62" | 620 m || 
|-id=777 bgcolor=#d6d6d6
| 402777 ||  || — || January 27, 2007 || Mount Lemmon || Mount Lemmon Survey || — || align=right | 3.1 km || 
|-id=778 bgcolor=#d6d6d6
| 402778 ||  || — || January 27, 2007 || Mount Lemmon || Mount Lemmon Survey || — || align=right | 2.4 km || 
|-id=779 bgcolor=#d6d6d6
| 402779 ||  || — || February 6, 2007 || Mount Lemmon || Mount Lemmon Survey || — || align=right | 2.5 km || 
|-id=780 bgcolor=#d6d6d6
| 402780 ||  || — || August 14, 2004 || Campo Imperatore || CINEOS || EOS || align=right | 1.9 km || 
|-id=781 bgcolor=#E9E9E9
| 402781 ||  || — || February 6, 2007 || Mount Lemmon || Mount Lemmon Survey || — || align=right | 1.5 km || 
|-id=782 bgcolor=#d6d6d6
| 402782 ||  || — || February 6, 2007 || Mount Lemmon || Mount Lemmon Survey || — || align=right | 2.9 km || 
|-id=783 bgcolor=#d6d6d6
| 402783 ||  || — || January 27, 2007 || Mount Lemmon || Mount Lemmon Survey || — || align=right | 2.6 km || 
|-id=784 bgcolor=#E9E9E9
| 402784 ||  || — || February 12, 2007 || Jarnac || Jarnac Obs. || — || align=right | 2.2 km || 
|-id=785 bgcolor=#d6d6d6
| 402785 ||  || — || February 8, 2007 || Kitt Peak || Spacewatch || EUP || align=right | 4.5 km || 
|-id=786 bgcolor=#d6d6d6
| 402786 ||  || — || February 17, 2007 || Kitt Peak || Spacewatch || — || align=right | 2.2 km || 
|-id=787 bgcolor=#d6d6d6
| 402787 ||  || — || February 17, 2007 || Kitt Peak || Spacewatch || — || align=right | 2.2 km || 
|-id=788 bgcolor=#d6d6d6
| 402788 ||  || — || February 17, 2007 || Kitt Peak || Spacewatch || EOS || align=right | 1.4 km || 
|-id=789 bgcolor=#d6d6d6
| 402789 ||  || — || February 17, 2007 || Kitt Peak || Spacewatch || — || align=right | 3.4 km || 
|-id=790 bgcolor=#d6d6d6
| 402790 ||  || — || February 17, 2007 || Kitt Peak || Spacewatch || — || align=right | 2.9 km || 
|-id=791 bgcolor=#d6d6d6
| 402791 ||  || — || February 17, 2007 || Kitt Peak || Spacewatch || — || align=right | 2.8 km || 
|-id=792 bgcolor=#d6d6d6
| 402792 ||  || — || February 17, 2007 || Kitt Peak || Spacewatch || — || align=right | 2.9 km || 
|-id=793 bgcolor=#d6d6d6
| 402793 ||  || — || February 19, 2007 || Mount Lemmon || Mount Lemmon Survey || — || align=right | 3.6 km || 
|-id=794 bgcolor=#d6d6d6
| 402794 ||  || — || January 10, 2007 || Mount Lemmon || Mount Lemmon Survey || EOS || align=right | 1.7 km || 
|-id=795 bgcolor=#d6d6d6
| 402795 ||  || — || February 17, 2007 || Kitt Peak || Spacewatch || VER || align=right | 3.1 km || 
|-id=796 bgcolor=#d6d6d6
| 402796 ||  || — || February 17, 2007 || Kitt Peak || Spacewatch || EUP || align=right | 4.4 km || 
|-id=797 bgcolor=#d6d6d6
| 402797 ||  || — || February 21, 2007 || Kitt Peak || Spacewatch || — || align=right | 2.3 km || 
|-id=798 bgcolor=#d6d6d6
| 402798 ||  || — || February 19, 2007 || Catalina || CSS || — || align=right | 3.7 km || 
|-id=799 bgcolor=#d6d6d6
| 402799 ||  || — || December 27, 2006 || Mount Lemmon || Mount Lemmon Survey || — || align=right | 2.9 km || 
|-id=800 bgcolor=#d6d6d6
| 402800 ||  || — || February 21, 2007 || Kitt Peak || Spacewatch || — || align=right | 2.3 km || 
|}

402801–402900 

|-bgcolor=#fefefe
| 402801 ||  || — || February 21, 2007 || Kitt Peak || Spacewatch || — || align=right data-sort-value="0.61" | 610 m || 
|-id=802 bgcolor=#d6d6d6
| 402802 ||  || — || February 21, 2007 || Kitt Peak || Spacewatch || — || align=right | 2.3 km || 
|-id=803 bgcolor=#d6d6d6
| 402803 ||  || — || February 21, 2007 || Kitt Peak || Spacewatch || — || align=right | 2.6 km || 
|-id=804 bgcolor=#d6d6d6
| 402804 ||  || — || February 21, 2007 || Kitt Peak || Spacewatch || KOR || align=right | 1.4 km || 
|-id=805 bgcolor=#d6d6d6
| 402805 ||  || — || February 21, 2007 || Kitt Peak || Spacewatch || THM || align=right | 1.8 km || 
|-id=806 bgcolor=#d6d6d6
| 402806 ||  || — || February 22, 2007 || Anderson Mesa || LONEOS || — || align=right | 2.6 km || 
|-id=807 bgcolor=#E9E9E9
| 402807 ||  || — || January 27, 2007 || Mount Lemmon || Mount Lemmon Survey || — || align=right | 1.6 km || 
|-id=808 bgcolor=#d6d6d6
| 402808 ||  || — || January 28, 2007 || Mount Lemmon || Mount Lemmon Survey || TIR || align=right | 3.1 km || 
|-id=809 bgcolor=#E9E9E9
| 402809 ||  || — || February 23, 2007 || Mount Lemmon || Mount Lemmon Survey || — || align=right | 2.3 km || 
|-id=810 bgcolor=#fefefe
| 402810 ||  || — || January 28, 2007 || Mount Lemmon || Mount Lemmon Survey || — || align=right data-sort-value="0.55" | 550 m || 
|-id=811 bgcolor=#d6d6d6
| 402811 ||  || — || February 17, 2007 || Kitt Peak || Spacewatch || EOS || align=right | 2.2 km || 
|-id=812 bgcolor=#d6d6d6
| 402812 ||  || — || February 26, 2007 || Mount Lemmon || Mount Lemmon Survey || — || align=right | 2.4 km || 
|-id=813 bgcolor=#d6d6d6
| 402813 ||  || — || February 25, 2007 || Mount Lemmon || Mount Lemmon Survey || THM || align=right | 2.5 km || 
|-id=814 bgcolor=#d6d6d6
| 402814 ||  || — || March 9, 2007 || Kitt Peak || Spacewatch || — || align=right | 4.2 km || 
|-id=815 bgcolor=#d6d6d6
| 402815 ||  || — || February 22, 2007 || Kitt Peak || Spacewatch || — || align=right | 2.5 km || 
|-id=816 bgcolor=#fefefe
| 402816 ||  || — || March 9, 2007 || Kitt Peak || Spacewatch || — || align=right data-sort-value="0.71" | 710 m || 
|-id=817 bgcolor=#d6d6d6
| 402817 ||  || — || March 10, 2007 || Kitt Peak || Spacewatch || EOS || align=right | 1.8 km || 
|-id=818 bgcolor=#d6d6d6
| 402818 ||  || — || March 10, 2007 || Kitt Peak || Spacewatch || — || align=right | 2.1 km || 
|-id=819 bgcolor=#d6d6d6
| 402819 ||  || — || February 25, 2007 || Mount Lemmon || Mount Lemmon Survey || EOS || align=right | 2.1 km || 
|-id=820 bgcolor=#d6d6d6
| 402820 ||  || — || February 26, 2007 || Mount Lemmon || Mount Lemmon Survey || — || align=right | 2.5 km || 
|-id=821 bgcolor=#d6d6d6
| 402821 ||  || — || March 13, 2007 || Mount Lemmon || Mount Lemmon Survey || — || align=right | 3.8 km || 
|-id=822 bgcolor=#fefefe
| 402822 ||  || — || March 9, 2007 || Mount Lemmon || Mount Lemmon Survey || — || align=right data-sort-value="0.57" | 570 m || 
|-id=823 bgcolor=#d6d6d6
| 402823 ||  || — || February 26, 2007 || Mount Lemmon || Mount Lemmon Survey || — || align=right | 2.8 km || 
|-id=824 bgcolor=#fefefe
| 402824 ||  || — || March 12, 2007 || Kitt Peak || Spacewatch || — || align=right data-sort-value="0.73" | 730 m || 
|-id=825 bgcolor=#d6d6d6
| 402825 ||  || — || December 26, 2006 || Kitt Peak || Spacewatch || EOS || align=right | 3.0 km || 
|-id=826 bgcolor=#d6d6d6
| 402826 ||  || — || February 27, 2007 || Kitt Peak || Spacewatch || HYG || align=right | 2.3 km || 
|-id=827 bgcolor=#d6d6d6
| 402827 ||  || — || November 24, 2006 || Mount Lemmon || Mount Lemmon Survey || — || align=right | 3.2 km || 
|-id=828 bgcolor=#d6d6d6
| 402828 ||  || — || March 13, 2007 || Mount Lemmon || Mount Lemmon Survey || EMA || align=right | 3.6 km || 
|-id=829 bgcolor=#d6d6d6
| 402829 ||  || — || January 7, 2006 || Mount Lemmon || Mount Lemmon Survey || — || align=right | 2.4 km || 
|-id=830 bgcolor=#d6d6d6
| 402830 ||  || — || March 20, 2007 || Mount Lemmon || Mount Lemmon Survey || EOS || align=right | 1.8 km || 
|-id=831 bgcolor=#d6d6d6
| 402831 ||  || — || March 13, 2007 || Kitt Peak || Spacewatch || — || align=right | 3.1 km || 
|-id=832 bgcolor=#d6d6d6
| 402832 ||  || — || March 16, 2007 || Mount Lemmon || Mount Lemmon Survey || EOS || align=right | 2.5 km || 
|-id=833 bgcolor=#d6d6d6
| 402833 ||  || — || March 16, 2007 || Mount Lemmon || Mount Lemmon Survey || — || align=right | 2.7 km || 
|-id=834 bgcolor=#fefefe
| 402834 ||  || — || March 11, 2007 || Kitt Peak || Spacewatch || — || align=right data-sort-value="0.66" | 660 m || 
|-id=835 bgcolor=#d6d6d6
| 402835 ||  || — || March 26, 2007 || Catalina || CSS || THB || align=right | 3.0 km || 
|-id=836 bgcolor=#d6d6d6
| 402836 ||  || — || April 15, 2007 || Catalina || CSS || URS || align=right | 4.1 km || 
|-id=837 bgcolor=#fefefe
| 402837 ||  || — || March 26, 2007 || Kitt Peak || Spacewatch || — || align=right data-sort-value="0.74" | 740 m || 
|-id=838 bgcolor=#fefefe
| 402838 ||  || — || April 18, 2007 || Kitt Peak || Spacewatch || — || align=right data-sort-value="0.54" | 540 m || 
|-id=839 bgcolor=#d6d6d6
| 402839 ||  || — || March 14, 2007 || Kitt Peak || Spacewatch || — || align=right | 2.8 km || 
|-id=840 bgcolor=#d6d6d6
| 402840 ||  || — || March 26, 2007 || Mount Lemmon || Mount Lemmon Survey || — || align=right | 3.5 km || 
|-id=841 bgcolor=#d6d6d6
| 402841 ||  || — || April 25, 2007 || Mount Lemmon || Mount Lemmon Survey || 7:4 || align=right | 3.2 km || 
|-id=842 bgcolor=#d6d6d6
| 402842 ||  || — || June 18, 2007 || Kitt Peak || Spacewatch || — || align=right | 3.2 km || 
|-id=843 bgcolor=#fefefe
| 402843 || 2007 PX || — || August 4, 2007 || Reedy Creek || J. Broughton || — || align=right data-sort-value="0.76" | 760 m || 
|-id=844 bgcolor=#fefefe
| 402844 ||  || — || August 9, 2007 || Socorro || LINEAR || — || align=right data-sort-value="0.89" | 890 m || 
|-id=845 bgcolor=#fefefe
| 402845 ||  || — || August 9, 2007 || Kitt Peak || Spacewatch || — || align=right data-sort-value="0.73" | 730 m || 
|-id=846 bgcolor=#fefefe
| 402846 ||  || — || August 8, 2007 || Socorro || LINEAR || (2076) || align=right data-sort-value="0.89" | 890 m || 
|-id=847 bgcolor=#fefefe
| 402847 ||  || — || August 21, 2007 || Anderson Mesa || LONEOS || V || align=right data-sort-value="0.77" | 770 m || 
|-id=848 bgcolor=#fefefe
| 402848 ||  || — || August 21, 2007 || Anderson Mesa || LONEOS || — || align=right data-sort-value="0.86" | 860 m || 
|-id=849 bgcolor=#fefefe
| 402849 ||  || — || August 24, 2007 || Kitt Peak || Spacewatch || — || align=right data-sort-value="0.59" | 590 m || 
|-id=850 bgcolor=#fefefe
| 402850 ||  || — || August 22, 2007 || Anderson Mesa || LONEOS || — || align=right | 2.3 km || 
|-id=851 bgcolor=#fefefe
| 402851 ||  || — || September 5, 2007 || Siding Spring || K. Sárneczky, L. Kiss || — || align=right data-sort-value="0.74" | 740 m || 
|-id=852 bgcolor=#fefefe
| 402852 ||  || — || September 9, 2007 || Vicques || M. Ory || V || align=right data-sort-value="0.68" | 680 m || 
|-id=853 bgcolor=#fefefe
| 402853 ||  || — || September 12, 2007 || Hibiscus || N. Teamo, J.-C. Pelle || V || align=right data-sort-value="0.60" | 600 m || 
|-id=854 bgcolor=#fefefe
| 402854 ||  || — || September 8, 2007 || Anderson Mesa || LONEOS || NYS || align=right data-sort-value="0.61" | 610 m || 
|-id=855 bgcolor=#fefefe
| 402855 ||  || — || September 9, 2007 || Kitt Peak || Spacewatch || — || align=right | 1.1 km || 
|-id=856 bgcolor=#fefefe
| 402856 ||  || — || September 10, 2007 || Mount Lemmon || Mount Lemmon Survey || NYS || align=right data-sort-value="0.66" | 660 m || 
|-id=857 bgcolor=#fefefe
| 402857 ||  || — || September 10, 2007 || Mount Lemmon || Mount Lemmon Survey || — || align=right data-sort-value="0.70" | 700 m || 
|-id=858 bgcolor=#fefefe
| 402858 ||  || — || September 10, 2007 || Mount Lemmon || Mount Lemmon Survey || MAS || align=right data-sort-value="0.80" | 800 m || 
|-id=859 bgcolor=#fefefe
| 402859 ||  || — || September 10, 2007 || Kitt Peak || Spacewatch || — || align=right | 1.0 km || 
|-id=860 bgcolor=#fefefe
| 402860 ||  || — || September 10, 2007 || Kitt Peak || Spacewatch || — || align=right data-sort-value="0.72" | 720 m || 
|-id=861 bgcolor=#d6d6d6
| 402861 ||  || — || September 10, 2007 || Kitt Peak || Spacewatch || 3:2 || align=right | 5.7 km || 
|-id=862 bgcolor=#d6d6d6
| 402862 ||  || — || September 11, 2007 || Catalina || CSS || SHU3:2 || align=right | 6.8 km || 
|-id=863 bgcolor=#fefefe
| 402863 ||  || — || September 12, 2007 || Mount Lemmon || Mount Lemmon Survey || — || align=right data-sort-value="0.78" | 780 m || 
|-id=864 bgcolor=#FA8072
| 402864 ||  || — || September 14, 2007 || Mount Lemmon || Mount Lemmon Survey || — || align=right data-sort-value="0.64" | 640 m || 
|-id=865 bgcolor=#fefefe
| 402865 ||  || — || September 14, 2007 || Socorro || LINEAR || — || align=right | 1.2 km || 
|-id=866 bgcolor=#fefefe
| 402866 ||  || — || September 12, 2007 || Anderson Mesa || LONEOS || — || align=right data-sort-value="0.75" | 750 m || 
|-id=867 bgcolor=#FA8072
| 402867 ||  || — || September 12, 2007 || Catalina || CSS || — || align=right data-sort-value="0.76" | 760 m || 
|-id=868 bgcolor=#fefefe
| 402868 ||  || — || September 11, 2007 || Mount Lemmon || Mount Lemmon Survey || — || align=right data-sort-value="0.75" | 750 m || 
|-id=869 bgcolor=#d6d6d6
| 402869 ||  || — || September 12, 2007 || Kitt Peak || Spacewatch || 3:2 || align=right | 6.6 km || 
|-id=870 bgcolor=#fefefe
| 402870 ||  || — || September 9, 2007 || Kitt Peak || Spacewatch || — || align=right data-sort-value="0.87" | 870 m || 
|-id=871 bgcolor=#E9E9E9
| 402871 ||  || — || September 9, 2007 || Kitt Peak || Spacewatch || — || align=right data-sort-value="0.97" | 970 m || 
|-id=872 bgcolor=#fefefe
| 402872 ||  || — || September 10, 2007 || Mount Lemmon || Mount Lemmon Survey || — || align=right data-sort-value="0.59" | 590 m || 
|-id=873 bgcolor=#fefefe
| 402873 ||  || — || September 12, 2007 || Catalina || CSS || NYS || align=right data-sort-value="0.66" | 660 m || 
|-id=874 bgcolor=#fefefe
| 402874 ||  || — || September 11, 2007 || Mount Lemmon || Mount Lemmon Survey || NYS || align=right data-sort-value="0.70" | 700 m || 
|-id=875 bgcolor=#fefefe
| 402875 ||  || — || September 8, 2007 || Mount Lemmon || Mount Lemmon Survey || — || align=right data-sort-value="0.74" | 740 m || 
|-id=876 bgcolor=#fefefe
| 402876 ||  || — || September 11, 2007 || Mount Lemmon || Mount Lemmon Survey || NYS || align=right data-sort-value="0.59" | 590 m || 
|-id=877 bgcolor=#fefefe
| 402877 ||  || — || September 14, 2007 || Catalina || CSS || — || align=right data-sort-value="0.82" | 820 m || 
|-id=878 bgcolor=#fefefe
| 402878 ||  || — || March 8, 1995 || Kitt Peak || Spacewatch || — || align=right data-sort-value="0.84" | 840 m || 
|-id=879 bgcolor=#fefefe
| 402879 ||  || — || September 14, 2007 || Kitt Peak || Spacewatch || — || align=right data-sort-value="0.79" | 790 m || 
|-id=880 bgcolor=#fefefe
| 402880 ||  || — || September 14, 2007 || Kitt Peak || Spacewatch || — || align=right data-sort-value="0.81" | 810 m || 
|-id=881 bgcolor=#fefefe
| 402881 ||  || — || September 15, 2007 || Kitt Peak || Spacewatch || — || align=right data-sort-value="0.83" | 830 m || 
|-id=882 bgcolor=#E9E9E9
| 402882 ||  || — || September 9, 2007 || Kitt Peak || Spacewatch || — || align=right | 2.1 km || 
|-id=883 bgcolor=#fefefe
| 402883 ||  || — || September 13, 2007 || Mount Lemmon || Mount Lemmon Survey || — || align=right | 1.0 km || 
|-id=884 bgcolor=#fefefe
| 402884 ||  || — || September 12, 2007 || Mount Lemmon || Mount Lemmon Survey || — || align=right | 1.1 km || 
|-id=885 bgcolor=#fefefe
| 402885 ||  || — || September 13, 2007 || Mount Lemmon || Mount Lemmon Survey || NYS || align=right data-sort-value="0.63" | 630 m || 
|-id=886 bgcolor=#fefefe
| 402886 ||  || — || September 13, 2007 || Mount Lemmon || Mount Lemmon Survey || NYS || align=right data-sort-value="0.53" | 530 m || 
|-id=887 bgcolor=#fefefe
| 402887 ||  || — || September 8, 2007 || Anderson Mesa || LONEOS || — || align=right data-sort-value="0.89" | 890 m || 
|-id=888 bgcolor=#fefefe
| 402888 ||  || — || September 13, 2007 || Catalina || CSS || — || align=right data-sort-value="0.73" | 730 m || 
|-id=889 bgcolor=#fefefe
| 402889 ||  || — || September 15, 2007 || Mount Lemmon || Mount Lemmon Survey || — || align=right data-sort-value="0.75" | 750 m || 
|-id=890 bgcolor=#fefefe
| 402890 ||  || — || September 19, 2007 || Dauban || Chante-Perdrix Obs. || — || align=right data-sort-value="0.69" | 690 m || 
|-id=891 bgcolor=#fefefe
| 402891 ||  || — || September 11, 2007 || Purple Mountain || PMO NEO || — || align=right data-sort-value="0.80" | 800 m || 
|-id=892 bgcolor=#fefefe
| 402892 ||  || — || September 16, 2007 || Socorro || LINEAR || — || align=right data-sort-value="0.82" | 820 m || 
|-id=893 bgcolor=#fefefe
| 402893 ||  || — || September 18, 2007 || Kitt Peak || Spacewatch || — || align=right data-sort-value="0.80" | 800 m || 
|-id=894 bgcolor=#fefefe
| 402894 ||  || — || September 26, 2007 || Mount Lemmon || Mount Lemmon Survey || V || align=right data-sort-value="0.74" | 740 m || 
|-id=895 bgcolor=#fefefe
| 402895 ||  || — || September 20, 2007 || Catalina || CSS || — || align=right data-sort-value="0.88" | 880 m || 
|-id=896 bgcolor=#fefefe
| 402896 ||  || — || October 6, 2007 || Socorro || LINEAR || MAS || align=right data-sort-value="0.75" | 750 m || 
|-id=897 bgcolor=#fefefe
| 402897 ||  || — || September 5, 2007 || Mount Lemmon || Mount Lemmon Survey || — || align=right data-sort-value="0.66" | 660 m || 
|-id=898 bgcolor=#d6d6d6
| 402898 ||  || — || October 6, 2007 || Socorro || LINEAR || 3:2 || align=right | 4.2 km || 
|-id=899 bgcolor=#fefefe
| 402899 ||  || — || October 7, 2007 || Calvin-Rehoboth || Calvin–Rehoboth Obs. || — || align=right data-sort-value="0.73" | 730 m || 
|-id=900 bgcolor=#fefefe
| 402900 ||  || — || September 14, 2007 || Mount Lemmon || Mount Lemmon Survey || — || align=right data-sort-value="0.91" | 910 m || 
|}

402901–403000 

|-bgcolor=#FA8072
| 402901 ||  || — || September 4, 2007 || Catalina || CSS || PHO || align=right | 1.9 km || 
|-id=902 bgcolor=#fefefe
| 402902 ||  || — || October 4, 2007 || Catalina || CSS || MAS || align=right data-sort-value="0.68" | 680 m || 
|-id=903 bgcolor=#fefefe
| 402903 ||  || — || October 4, 2007 || Catalina || CSS || — || align=right data-sort-value="0.83" | 830 m || 
|-id=904 bgcolor=#fefefe
| 402904 ||  || — || September 12, 2007 || Mount Lemmon || Mount Lemmon Survey || — || align=right data-sort-value="0.70" | 700 m || 
|-id=905 bgcolor=#fefefe
| 402905 ||  || — || October 7, 2007 || Kitt Peak || Spacewatch || — || align=right | 1.0 km || 
|-id=906 bgcolor=#fefefe
| 402906 ||  || — || October 4, 2007 || Kitt Peak || Spacewatch || — || align=right | 1.0 km || 
|-id=907 bgcolor=#fefefe
| 402907 ||  || — || October 4, 2007 || Kitt Peak || Spacewatch || — || align=right data-sort-value="0.89" | 890 m || 
|-id=908 bgcolor=#fefefe
| 402908 ||  || — || September 9, 2007 || Mount Lemmon || Mount Lemmon Survey || MAS || align=right data-sort-value="0.67" | 670 m || 
|-id=909 bgcolor=#fefefe
| 402909 ||  || — || October 10, 2007 || Mount Lemmon || Mount Lemmon Survey || MAS || align=right data-sort-value="0.86" | 860 m || 
|-id=910 bgcolor=#fefefe
| 402910 ||  || — || October 14, 2007 || Bergisch Gladbac || W. Bickel || — || align=right data-sort-value="0.87" | 870 m || 
|-id=911 bgcolor=#fefefe
| 402911 ||  || — || October 5, 2007 || Kitt Peak || Spacewatch || — || align=right | 1.00 km || 
|-id=912 bgcolor=#fefefe
| 402912 ||  || — || October 7, 2007 || Catalina || CSS || MAS || align=right | 1.0 km || 
|-id=913 bgcolor=#fefefe
| 402913 ||  || — || October 8, 2007 || Anderson Mesa || LONEOS || — || align=right data-sort-value="0.83" | 830 m || 
|-id=914 bgcolor=#fefefe
| 402914 ||  || — || September 8, 2007 || Mount Lemmon || Mount Lemmon Survey || MAS || align=right data-sort-value="0.98" | 980 m || 
|-id=915 bgcolor=#fefefe
| 402915 ||  || — || October 6, 2007 || Kitt Peak || Spacewatch || — || align=right data-sort-value="0.65" | 650 m || 
|-id=916 bgcolor=#fefefe
| 402916 ||  || — || October 6, 2007 || Kitt Peak || Spacewatch || — || align=right data-sort-value="0.72" | 720 m || 
|-id=917 bgcolor=#fefefe
| 402917 ||  || — || September 11, 2007 || Catalina || CSS || — || align=right data-sort-value="0.98" | 980 m || 
|-id=918 bgcolor=#fefefe
| 402918 ||  || — || October 8, 2007 || Kitt Peak || Spacewatch || — || align=right data-sort-value="0.76" | 760 m || 
|-id=919 bgcolor=#fefefe
| 402919 ||  || — || October 9, 2007 || Mount Lemmon || Mount Lemmon Survey || — || align=right data-sort-value="0.88" | 880 m || 
|-id=920 bgcolor=#d6d6d6
| 402920 Tsawout ||  ||  || October 7, 2007 || Mauna Kea || D. D. Balam || 3:2 || align=right | 4.2 km || 
|-id=921 bgcolor=#fefefe
| 402921 ||  || — || October 9, 2007 || Goodricke-Pigott || R. A. Tucker || — || align=right | 1.1 km || 
|-id=922 bgcolor=#fefefe
| 402922 ||  || — || October 9, 2007 || Socorro || LINEAR || — || align=right data-sort-value="0.64" | 640 m || 
|-id=923 bgcolor=#fefefe
| 402923 ||  || — || September 13, 2007 || Kitt Peak || Spacewatch || — || align=right data-sort-value="0.89" | 890 m || 
|-id=924 bgcolor=#fefefe
| 402924 ||  || — || September 5, 2007 || Mount Lemmon || Mount Lemmon Survey || — || align=right data-sort-value="0.74" | 740 m || 
|-id=925 bgcolor=#fefefe
| 402925 ||  || — || September 20, 2007 || Catalina || CSS || — || align=right data-sort-value="0.82" | 820 m || 
|-id=926 bgcolor=#d6d6d6
| 402926 ||  || — || October 11, 2007 || Socorro || LINEAR || SHU3:2 || align=right | 5.7 km || 
|-id=927 bgcolor=#fefefe
| 402927 ||  || — || October 11, 2007 || Socorro || LINEAR || — || align=right data-sort-value="0.87" | 870 m || 
|-id=928 bgcolor=#fefefe
| 402928 ||  || — || October 13, 2007 || Socorro || LINEAR || — || align=right data-sort-value="0.89" | 890 m || 
|-id=929 bgcolor=#fefefe
| 402929 ||  || — || October 6, 2007 || Kitt Peak || Spacewatch || NYS || align=right data-sort-value="0.67" | 670 m || 
|-id=930 bgcolor=#fefefe
| 402930 ||  || — || October 8, 2007 || Anderson Mesa || LONEOS || — || align=right data-sort-value="0.89" | 890 m || 
|-id=931 bgcolor=#fefefe
| 402931 ||  || — || October 7, 2007 || Kitt Peak || Spacewatch || — || align=right data-sort-value="0.81" | 810 m || 
|-id=932 bgcolor=#fefefe
| 402932 ||  || — || October 7, 2007 || Kitt Peak || Spacewatch || — || align=right data-sort-value="0.89" | 890 m || 
|-id=933 bgcolor=#fefefe
| 402933 ||  || — || October 7, 2007 || Kitt Peak || Spacewatch || — || align=right data-sort-value="0.75" | 750 m || 
|-id=934 bgcolor=#fefefe
| 402934 ||  || — || October 10, 2007 || Catalina || CSS || — || align=right | 1.0 km || 
|-id=935 bgcolor=#fefefe
| 402935 ||  || — || October 10, 2007 || Mount Lemmon || Mount Lemmon Survey || NYS || align=right data-sort-value="0.70" | 700 m || 
|-id=936 bgcolor=#fefefe
| 402936 ||  || — || September 12, 2007 || Catalina || CSS || — || align=right data-sort-value="0.80" | 800 m || 
|-id=937 bgcolor=#fefefe
| 402937 ||  || — || October 7, 2007 || Mount Lemmon || Mount Lemmon Survey || — || align=right data-sort-value="0.74" | 740 m || 
|-id=938 bgcolor=#d6d6d6
| 402938 ||  || — || October 10, 2007 || Kitt Peak || Spacewatch || SHU3:2 || align=right | 6.3 km || 
|-id=939 bgcolor=#fefefe
| 402939 ||  || — || October 10, 2007 || Kitt Peak || Spacewatch || MAS || align=right data-sort-value="0.68" | 680 m || 
|-id=940 bgcolor=#fefefe
| 402940 ||  || — || October 12, 2007 || Kitt Peak || Spacewatch || — || align=right data-sort-value="0.70" | 700 m || 
|-id=941 bgcolor=#d6d6d6
| 402941 ||  || — || October 11, 2007 || Catalina || CSS || SHU3:2 || align=right | 5.5 km || 
|-id=942 bgcolor=#fefefe
| 402942 ||  || — || October 11, 2007 || Mount Lemmon || Mount Lemmon Survey || — || align=right data-sort-value="0.84" | 840 m || 
|-id=943 bgcolor=#fefefe
| 402943 ||  || — || October 11, 2007 || Catalina || CSS || — || align=right data-sort-value="0.89" | 890 m || 
|-id=944 bgcolor=#fefefe
| 402944 ||  || — || October 11, 2007 || Kitt Peak || Spacewatch || — || align=right data-sort-value="0.86" | 860 m || 
|-id=945 bgcolor=#fefefe
| 402945 ||  || — || October 11, 2007 || Kitt Peak || Spacewatch || NYS || align=right data-sort-value="0.69" | 690 m || 
|-id=946 bgcolor=#FA8072
| 402946 ||  || — || August 9, 2007 || Socorro || LINEAR || — || align=right data-sort-value="0.66" | 660 m || 
|-id=947 bgcolor=#fefefe
| 402947 ||  || — || October 11, 2007 || Catalina || CSS || — || align=right data-sort-value="0.93" | 930 m || 
|-id=948 bgcolor=#fefefe
| 402948 ||  || — || October 14, 2007 || Mount Lemmon || Mount Lemmon Survey || V || align=right data-sort-value="0.87" | 870 m || 
|-id=949 bgcolor=#d6d6d6
| 402949 ||  || — || October 15, 2007 || Mount Lemmon || Mount Lemmon Survey || 3:2 || align=right | 3.7 km || 
|-id=950 bgcolor=#fefefe
| 402950 ||  || — || October 9, 2007 || Kitt Peak || Spacewatch || — || align=right data-sort-value="0.90" | 900 m || 
|-id=951 bgcolor=#fefefe
| 402951 ||  || — || October 7, 2007 || Kitt Peak || Spacewatch || — || align=right data-sort-value="0.86" | 860 m || 
|-id=952 bgcolor=#fefefe
| 402952 ||  || — || October 15, 2007 || Kitt Peak || Spacewatch || V || align=right data-sort-value="0.70" | 700 m || 
|-id=953 bgcolor=#E9E9E9
| 402953 ||  || — || October 12, 2007 || Mount Lemmon || Mount Lemmon Survey || MAR || align=right data-sort-value="0.94" | 940 m || 
|-id=954 bgcolor=#d6d6d6
| 402954 ||  || — || October 15, 2007 || Catalina || CSS || 3:2 || align=right | 5.5 km || 
|-id=955 bgcolor=#fefefe
| 402955 ||  || — || October 15, 2007 || Catalina || CSS || — || align=right data-sort-value="0.69" | 690 m || 
|-id=956 bgcolor=#fefefe
| 402956 ||  || — || October 13, 2007 || Mount Lemmon || Mount Lemmon Survey || MAS || align=right data-sort-value="0.61" | 610 m || 
|-id=957 bgcolor=#fefefe
| 402957 ||  || — || October 13, 2007 || Catalina || CSS || — || align=right data-sort-value="0.77" | 770 m || 
|-id=958 bgcolor=#d6d6d6
| 402958 ||  || — || October 15, 2007 || Catalina || CSS || SHU3:2 || align=right | 6.1 km || 
|-id=959 bgcolor=#fefefe
| 402959 ||  || — || October 15, 2007 || Catalina || CSS || MAS || align=right data-sort-value="0.75" | 750 m || 
|-id=960 bgcolor=#fefefe
| 402960 ||  || — || October 12, 2007 || Catalina || CSS || — || align=right data-sort-value="0.86" | 860 m || 
|-id=961 bgcolor=#fefefe
| 402961 ||  || — || October 14, 2007 || Mount Lemmon || Mount Lemmon Survey || — || align=right data-sort-value="0.92" | 920 m || 
|-id=962 bgcolor=#fefefe
| 402962 ||  || — || October 4, 2007 || Kitt Peak || Spacewatch || NYS || align=right data-sort-value="0.60" | 600 m || 
|-id=963 bgcolor=#fefefe
| 402963 ||  || — || October 13, 2007 || Socorro || LINEAR || — || align=right | 1.1 km || 
|-id=964 bgcolor=#fefefe
| 402964 ||  || — || October 17, 2007 || Andrushivka || Andrushivka Obs. || — || align=right data-sort-value="0.93" | 930 m || 
|-id=965 bgcolor=#fefefe
| 402965 ||  || — || October 17, 2007 || Dauban || Chante-Perdrix Obs. || — || align=right data-sort-value="0.74" | 740 m || 
|-id=966 bgcolor=#d6d6d6
| 402966 ||  || — || October 17, 2007 || Anderson Mesa || LONEOS || 3:2 || align=right | 4.4 km || 
|-id=967 bgcolor=#fefefe
| 402967 ||  || — || October 10, 2007 || Catalina || CSS || — || align=right data-sort-value="0.73" | 730 m || 
|-id=968 bgcolor=#fefefe
| 402968 ||  || — || September 25, 2007 || Mount Lemmon || Mount Lemmon Survey || — || align=right data-sort-value="0.65" | 650 m || 
|-id=969 bgcolor=#fefefe
| 402969 ||  || — || October 20, 2007 || Mount Lemmon || Mount Lemmon Survey || NYS || align=right data-sort-value="0.76" | 760 m || 
|-id=970 bgcolor=#fefefe
| 402970 ||  || — || October 21, 2007 || Kitt Peak || Spacewatch || V || align=right data-sort-value="0.65" | 650 m || 
|-id=971 bgcolor=#fefefe
| 402971 ||  || — || October 30, 2007 || Mount Lemmon || Mount Lemmon Survey || — || align=right data-sort-value="0.80" | 800 m || 
|-id=972 bgcolor=#fefefe
| 402972 ||  || — || October 30, 2007 || Mount Lemmon || Mount Lemmon Survey || NYS || align=right data-sort-value="0.76" | 760 m || 
|-id=973 bgcolor=#fefefe
| 402973 ||  || — || October 20, 2007 || Catalina || CSS || NYS || align=right data-sort-value="0.70" | 700 m || 
|-id=974 bgcolor=#fefefe
| 402974 ||  || — || October 30, 2007 || Kitt Peak || Spacewatch || — || align=right data-sort-value="0.81" | 810 m || 
|-id=975 bgcolor=#fefefe
| 402975 ||  || — || October 31, 2007 || Kitt Peak || Spacewatch || — || align=right data-sort-value="0.98" | 980 m || 
|-id=976 bgcolor=#d6d6d6
| 402976 ||  || — || October 20, 2007 || Catalina || CSS || SHU3:2 || align=right | 7.1 km || 
|-id=977 bgcolor=#fefefe
| 402977 ||  || — || October 30, 2007 || Catalina || CSS || — || align=right data-sort-value="0.80" | 800 m || 
|-id=978 bgcolor=#fefefe
| 402978 ||  || — || October 20, 2007 || Mount Lemmon || Mount Lemmon Survey || — || align=right data-sort-value="0.87" | 870 m || 
|-id=979 bgcolor=#fefefe
| 402979 ||  || — || October 20, 2007 || Socorro || LINEAR || — || align=right | 1.0 km || 
|-id=980 bgcolor=#d6d6d6
| 402980 ||  || — || October 24, 2007 || Mount Lemmon || Mount Lemmon Survey || SHU3:2 || align=right | 6.0 km || 
|-id=981 bgcolor=#fefefe
| 402981 ||  || — || November 4, 2007 || La Sagra || OAM Obs. || NYS || align=right data-sort-value="0.69" | 690 m || 
|-id=982 bgcolor=#fefefe
| 402982 ||  || — || November 1, 2007 || Kitt Peak || Spacewatch || NYS || align=right data-sort-value="0.63" | 630 m || 
|-id=983 bgcolor=#fefefe
| 402983 ||  || — || October 10, 2007 || Mount Lemmon || Mount Lemmon Survey || — || align=right | 2.1 km || 
|-id=984 bgcolor=#fefefe
| 402984 ||  || — || November 1, 2007 || Kitt Peak || Spacewatch || — || align=right data-sort-value="0.91" | 910 m || 
|-id=985 bgcolor=#E9E9E9
| 402985 ||  || — || November 2, 2007 || Kitt Peak || Spacewatch || — || align=right | 1.1 km || 
|-id=986 bgcolor=#fefefe
| 402986 ||  || — || November 3, 2007 || Kitt Peak || Spacewatch || MAS || align=right data-sort-value="0.62" | 620 m || 
|-id=987 bgcolor=#fefefe
| 402987 ||  || — || October 10, 2007 || Anderson Mesa || LONEOS || — || align=right data-sort-value="0.86" | 860 m || 
|-id=988 bgcolor=#fefefe
| 402988 ||  || — || September 26, 2007 || Mount Lemmon || Mount Lemmon Survey || — || align=right data-sort-value="0.86" | 860 m || 
|-id=989 bgcolor=#fefefe
| 402989 ||  || — || November 4, 2007 || Socorro || LINEAR || MAS || align=right data-sort-value="0.89" | 890 m || 
|-id=990 bgcolor=#E9E9E9
| 402990 ||  || — || November 2, 2007 || Kitt Peak || Spacewatch || — || align=right | 1.3 km || 
|-id=991 bgcolor=#fefefe
| 402991 ||  || — || November 7, 2007 || Kitt Peak || Spacewatch || — || align=right | 1.3 km || 
|-id=992 bgcolor=#fefefe
| 402992 ||  || — || October 5, 2007 || Kitt Peak || Spacewatch || — || align=right data-sort-value="0.77" | 770 m || 
|-id=993 bgcolor=#E9E9E9
| 402993 ||  || — || October 16, 2007 || Mount Lemmon || Mount Lemmon Survey || — || align=right data-sort-value="0.95" | 950 m || 
|-id=994 bgcolor=#E9E9E9
| 402994 ||  || — || November 5, 2007 || Kitt Peak || Spacewatch || — || align=right data-sort-value="0.86" | 860 m || 
|-id=995 bgcolor=#E9E9E9
| 402995 ||  || — || November 9, 2007 || Mount Lemmon || Mount Lemmon Survey || fast? || align=right | 2.2 km || 
|-id=996 bgcolor=#E9E9E9
| 402996 ||  || — || November 2, 2007 || Kitt Peak || Spacewatch || — || align=right | 1.2 km || 
|-id=997 bgcolor=#fefefe
| 402997 ||  || — || November 7, 2007 || Kitt Peak || Spacewatch || — || align=right | 1.1 km || 
|-id=998 bgcolor=#fefefe
| 402998 ||  || — || November 11, 2007 || Bisei SG Center || BATTeRS || — || align=right data-sort-value="0.73" | 730 m || 
|-id=999 bgcolor=#fefefe
| 402999 ||  || — || November 13, 2007 || Kitt Peak || Spacewatch || MAS || align=right data-sort-value="0.77" | 770 m || 
|-id=000 bgcolor=#E9E9E9
| 403000 ||  || — || November 3, 2007 || Kitt Peak || Spacewatch || — || align=right | 1.1 km || 
|}

References

External links 
 Discovery Circumstances: Numbered Minor Planets (400001)–(405000) (IAU Minor Planet Center)

0402